= McCutcheon v. FEC =

McCutcheon v. Federal Election Commission
- Supreme Court of the United States

Argued October 8, 2013 Decided April 2, 2014
- Full case name: Shaun McCutcheon, et al., Appellants v. Federal Election Commission
- Docket no.: 12-536
- Citations: 572 U.S. 185 (more) 134 S. Ct. 1434; 188 L. Ed. 2d 468
- Argument: Oral argument

Case history
- Prior: 893 F. Supp. 2d 133 (D.D.C. 2012)

Holding
- Limitations on aggregate contributions to campaign finances violate the Free Speech Clause of the First Amendment to the Constitution of the United States.

Court membership
- Chief Justice John Roberts Associate Justices Antonin Scalia · Anthony Kennedy; Clarence Thomas · Ruth Bader Ginsburg; Stephen Breyer · Samuel Alito; Sonia Sotomayor · Elena Kagan

Case opinions
- Plurality: Roberts, joined by Scalia, Kennedy, Alito
- Concurrence: Thomas (in judgment)
- Dissent: Breyer, joined by Ginsburg, Sotomayor, Kagan

Laws applied
- U.S. Const. amend. I

McCutcheon v. Federal Election Commission, 572 U.S. 185 (2014), was a landmark decision of the US Supreme Court on campaign finance. The decision held that Section 441 of the Federal Election Campaign Act of 1971, which imposed a limit on contributions an individual can make over a two-year period to all national party and federal candidate committees, is unconstitutional.

The case was argued before the Supreme Court on October 8, 2013, being brought on appeal after the United States District Court for the District of Columbia dismissed the challenge. It was decided on April 2, 2014, by a 5–4 vote, reversing the decision below and remanding. Justices Roberts, Scalia, Kennedy, and Alito invalidated "aggregate contribution limits" (amounts one can contribute over the two-year period) as violating the First Amendment. Justice Thomas provided the necessary fifth vote but concurred separately in the judgment, while arguing that all contribution limits are unconstitutional.

== Background ==
The Federal Election Campaign Act (FECA) was first passed in 1971. Amendments to FECA in 1974, after the Watergate scandal, limited the total amount of direct contributions an individual could make to national political parties and federal candidates in a given year. These "aggregate contribution limits" were subsequently upheld in Buckley v. Valeo (1976). The Court's decision in Valeo recognized that independent contributions were protected speech, but also held that the aggregate contribution limits were constitutional because the government had a compelling interest in preventing "corruption" and the "appearance of corruption".

In 2002, the Bipartisan Campaign Reform Act (BCRA) was passed. The BCRA revised the aggregate limits, adjusted them to future (but not past) inflation, and changed the individual limitations from annual to biennial; The aggregate contribution ceiling on individuals during the 2011-2012 election cycle stood at $46,200 for federal candidates and $70,800 for national parties, or a $117,000 aggregate limit.

Plaintiff Shaun McCutcheon is a businessman and electrical engineer from suburban Birmingham, Alabama, who is a campaign contributor and self-described activist of the Republican Party. The founder and CEO of Coalmont Electrical Development Corporation, McCutcheon began donating to Republican candidates in the late 1990s, and would ultimately join the Jefferson County Republican Party Executive Committee. At a 2011 Young Conservatives Coalition event, McCutcheon met attorney and campaign finance expert Dan Backer, who would play a major role in encouraging McCutcheon to file suit against the FEC. In September 2012, McCutcheon had given $33,088 to sixteen federal candidates during the 2011-2012 cycle. He also had the desire to contribute $25,000 to each of the three Republican national party committees during that same cycle but was restricted by the aggregate limit on contributions to political committees. McCutcheon intended to continue making similar contributions in the future, aiming to donate at least $60,000 to various candidates and $75,000 to non-candidate political committees during the 2013-2014 election cycle, bringing his contribution total over the federal aggregate limit on federal candidates. McCutcheon filed suit against the Federal Election Commission (FEC), where he was joined in his lawsuit by the Republican National Committee.

=== U.S. District Court ===
On June 22, 2012, the plaintiffs filed a Verified Complaint before the U.S. District Court for the District of Columbia, asking the court to revisit the precedent set in the Buckley case and calling the limits on contributions to federally elected candidates a "burden on speech and association." The case was heard by a three-judge court, with judges James E. Boasberg, Janice Rogers Brown and Robert L. Wilkins designated to hear the case.

On September 28, 2012, the U.S. District Court granted the FEC's motion to dismiss; upholding the aggregate limits. The court held that:

The government may justify the aggregate limits as a means of preventing corruption or the appearance of corruption, or as a means of preventing circumvention of contribution limits imposed to further its anticorruption interest.

On October 9, 2012, the plaintiffs filed an appeal to the Supreme Court; the Court noted probable jurisdiction on February 19, 2013.

== Decision ==
The court heard oral arguments on October 8, 2013. Erin E. Murphy, counsel at Bancroft PLLC, argued for the appellants. Attorney Michael T. Morley was counsel of record for Appellant McCutcheon and was primarily responsible for preparing his principal brief. United States Solicitor General Donald Verrilli Jr. argued for the appellees: the Federal Election Commission and the Obama administration.

On April 2, 2014, the court ruled, 5–4, for the appellants. While the ruling overturned limits on aggregate federal campaign contributions, it did not affect limits on how much individuals can give to an individual politician's campaign, which remain at $2,700 per election. The majority opinion, authored by Chief Justice John Roberts, concluded that the aggregate limits violated the First Amendment because they did not serve a compelling government interest and were not narrowly tailored to prevent corruption or the appearance of corruption. Chief Justice Roberts wrote in the legal opinion: "The government may no more restrict how many candidates or causes a donor may support than it may tell a newspaper how many candidates it may endorse."

=== Concurrence and dissent ===
Justice Thomas concurred in the judgment but wished to go further and abolish all campaign contribution limits: "limiting the amount of money a person may give to a candidate does impose a direct restraint on his political communication." He rejected the rationale of Buckley v. Valeo that "[a] contribution serves as a general expression of support for the candidate and his views, but does not communicate the underlying basis for the support" since "this Court has never required a speaker to explain the reasons for his position in order to obtain full First Amendment protection."

Justices Breyer, Ginsburg, Sotomayor and Kagan dissented, arguing that the decision "creates a loophole that will allow a single individual to contribute millions of dollars to a political party or to a candidate's campaign. Taken together with Citizens United v. Federal Election Comm'n, 558 U. S. 310 (2010), today's decision eviscerates our Nation's campaign finance laws, leaving a remnant incapable of dealing with the grave problems of democratic legitimacy that those laws were intended to resolve."

== Reactions ==
In response to the decision, a coalition of environmental, voting rights, labor, and government reform groups rallied outside of the Supreme Court. Environmentalists from Greenpeace and the Sierra Club protested what Phil Radford of Greenpeace called a "legalized system of corruption through money in politics" that had resulted in few major environmental laws passing in the U.S. since 1980.

Writing for The Nation, Ari Berman wrote, "The Court's conservative majority believes that the First Amendment gives wealthy donors and powerful corporations the carte blanche right to buy an election but that the Fifteenth Amendment does not give Americans the right to vote free of racial discrimination."

Countering Berman's quote, Robert J. Samuelson pointed out that "the rich" is not one single block but that it has many different factions. He added that money does not "guarantee victory. After a certain point, more money hits the law of diminishing returns. It can be and is misspent." Samuelson also said that there are poor politicians who cannot communicate and so need money "to hire campaign staff, build a website, buy political spots and the like" to "affect how people behave."

The Center for Competitive Politics, a leading group advocating for deregulation of campaign finance, heralded the decision in a statement: "the Court's conclusion was common sense: the law limited an individual to contributing the legal maximum to just 18 candidates. If the first 18 aren't 'corrupted' by the contribution, why is candidate 19? What's remarkable is that four justices of the Supreme Court continue to believe that such overt limitations on political speech are constitutional. Moreover, to reach that conclusion the dissenters relied on a series of preposterous hypotheticals bearing no resemblance to reality."

In The New Yorker, Jeffrey Toobin wrote that "the language of Chief Justice John Roberts's opinion suggests that the Court remains committed to the project announced most prominently in the Citizens United case, four years ago: the deregulation of American political campaigns."

Only 30 hours after the McCutcheon case came down, Professors Ronald K. L. Collins and David Skover published an 80,000-word narrative account of the history of the case, which included an analysis of the Court's opinion. The e-book is titled When Money Speaks: The McCutcheon Decision, Campaign Finance Laws & the First Amendment (Top Five Books, 2014).

Following the decision, SCOTUSblog published a symposium on the case with a foreword by Collins and Skover as well as commentaries by Floyd Abrams, Jan Baran, Rick Hasen, Burt Neuborne, Ilya Shapiro, Paul M. Smith, and Fred Wertheimer (April 3–4, 2014).

== See also ==
- James Bopp
- US corporate law
- Corporate personhood
- Citizens United v. Federal Election Commission
- Buckley v. Valeo
