= DISCLOSE Act =

U.S. proposed campaign finance reform legislation

The Democracy Is Strengthened by Casting Light on Spending in Elections Act, or DISCLOSE Act, is a federal campaign finance reform bill that has been introduced in the United States Congress since 2010. The bill would amend the Federal Election Campaign Act of 1971 to provide for greater and faster public disclosure of campaign spending and to combat the use of so-called "dark money" in U.S. elections.

The DISCLOSE Act passed the House of Representatives in June 2010 on a 219–206 vote, but was defeated in the Senate by a successful Republican filibuster; after cloture motions in July 2010 and September 2010 resulted in 57–41 and 59–39 votes, respectively, failing to obtain the necessary 60 votes to advance. Senate and House Democrats, such as Senator Sheldon Whitehouse of Rhode Island, have re-introduced variants of the DISCLOSE Act to each succeeding Congress since 2010. An unsuccessful 2014 version of the bill was sponsored by 50 Senate Democrats. In 2019, the DISCLOSE Act requirements were incorporated into the broader For the People Act (H.R. 1), which passed the Democratic-controlled House of Representatives on a party-line 234–193 vote, but did not advance in the then Republican-controlled Senate.

== Background and provisions ==
In 2010, the Supreme Court issued a 5–4 decision in Citizens United v. FEC, ruling that 2 U.S.C. 441a, which prohibited corporations and unions from making independent expenditures in political campaigns, was unconstitutional. The decision overturned an earlier decision, Austin v. Michigan Chamber of Commerce (1990). In response, Democrats in Congress introduced the DISCLOSE Act to establish new disclosure and other requirements for campaign-related spending. Democrats sought to enhance transparency requirements because the Citizens United decision, while striking down some federal campaign finance laws, upheld the existing federal disclosure requirements and indicated that Congress and states could constitutionally require further disclosures, stating that "Transparency enables the electorate to make informed decisions and give proper weight to different speakers and messages."

The bill would amend the Federal Election Campaign Act of 1971 to provide for greater and faster public disclosure of campaign spending and to combat the use of "dark money" in U.S. elections (which increased from $69 million in 2008 to $310 million in 2012). The 2023 version of the DISCLOSE Act bill:

- This bill addresses campaign finance, including by expanding the prohibition on campaign spending by foreign nationals, requiring additional disclosures of campaign expenditures, and requiring additional disclosures regarding certain political advertisements.
- Specifically, the bill expands existing foreign money prohibitions to include disbursements for paid web-based or digital communications and federal judicial nomination communications. It also prohibits foreign nationals from contributing to campaigns related to ballot initiatives and referendums.
- The Government Accountability Office must, for each four-year election cycle, study and report on the incidence of illicit foreign money in federal elections.
- Next, the bill makes it unlawful to establish or use a corporation, company, or other entity with the intent to conceal an election contribution or donation by a foreign national. A violator is subject to criminal penalties—a fine, a prison term of up to five years, or both.
- Covered organizations (e.g., corporations, labor organizations, and political organizations) must, within 24 hours, file reports with the Federal Election Commission to disclose campaign expenditures of more than $10,000 during an election cycle.
- The bill also requires organizations to provide additional disclosures regarding political advertisements, including the donors who contributed the most money to that organization in the last year.

== Legislative history ==
The chief sponsors of the 2010 bill were Representative Chris Van Hollen, the chairman of the Democratic Congressional Campaign Committee, and Senator Charles Schumer, a former chairman of the Democratic Senatorial Campaign Committee. The bill attracted almost no support from Republicans; among the 114 co-sponsors of the 2010 House version of the legislation, only two (Mike Castle of Delaware and Walter B. Jones Jr. of North Carolina) were Republicans.

The DISCLOSE Act (H.R. 5175) passed the U.S. House of Representatives in June 2010 on a 219–206 vote. However, the bill was defeated in the Senate following a successful Republican filibuster on July 27, 2010 in a 57–41 vote. On September 23, 2010, the bill was defeated again in a 59–39 vote.

Senator Sheldon Whitehouse of Rhode Island, and other Senate and House Democrats, have re-introduced variants of the DISCLOSE Act to each succeeding Congress since 2010. (Note: The legislation was introduced in the 112th Congress (2011–2012), 113th Congress (2013–2014), 114th Congress (2015–2016), 115th Congress (2017–2018), and 116th Congress (2019–2020), without success.) "H.R.1118 - 118th Congress (2023-2024): DISCLOSE Act of 2023." Congress.gov, Library of Congress, 11 July 2023, https://www.congress.gov/bill/118th-congress/house-bill/1118.In%5B%5D July 2012, the Senate again debated the DISCLOSE Act, but a motion to invoke cloture was defeated on a 53–45 vote. The Senate Rules Committee held one hearing on the bill in the 113th Congress (2013-2014), and no significant legislative activity took place in the next two Congresses. The unsuccessful 2014 version of the bill was sponsored by 50 Senate Democrats.

In 2019, the DISCLOSE Act requirements were incorporated into the broader For the People Act (H.R. 1), which passed the Democratic-controlled House of Representatives on a party-line 234–193 vote and has not advanced in the Republican-controlled Senate.

== Support and opposition ==
The DISCLOSE Act is supported by congressional Democrats, who describe it as a campaign finance reform measure necessary to combat dark money in response to the Citizens United decision. The chief sponsor of the legislation, Senator Sheldon Whitehouse of Rhode Island, said that the DISCLOSE Act was necessary to counter big-money campaign expenditures that threaten "to drown out the voice of middle-class families in our democracy." while Senator Schumer described the legislation as a way to "limit fallout" from the Citizens United decision to constrain the influence of "unlimited special-interest spending on elections." The legislation was supported by President Barack Obama, who said that the bill as "a critical piece of legislation to control the flood of special interest money into our elections" and praised its provisions that "would establish the strongest-ever disclosure requirements for election-related spending by special interests, including Wall Street and big oil companies, and...would restrict spending by foreign-controlled corporations" to "give the American public the right to see exactly who is spending money in an attempt to influence campaigns for public office."

The legislation is also supported by reform-oriented groups, such as Common Cause, Public Citizen, Democracy 21, the League of Women Voters, and the Campaign Legal Center, as well as the Brennan Center for Justice, Citizens for Responsibility and Ethics in Washington, Demos, People For the American Way, and the Sunlight Foundation. Supporters of the bill argue that the proposed disclosure requirements are constitutional under applicable Supreme Court precedent, such as Doe v. Reed.

The U.S. Public Interest Research Group and Sierra Club initially supported the 2010 bill, but pulled their support after Democrats agreed to add a provision that would exempt the National Rifle Association (NRA) and a handful of other large groups from the disclosure requirements at the heart of the legislation. This carve-out for the NRA was eliminated in the 2012 version of the legislation, which prompted the NRA to oppose the bill.

The AFL–CIO supported legislative action to counter the Citizens United decision and what it termed "the excessive and disproportionate influence by business." The labor federation did not object to the House version of the 2010 legislation, but did publicly oppose the Senate version of the legislation because it would have required affiliate unions to disclose financial transfers within their labor federations, which the AFL-CIO objected to as "extraordinary new costly and impractical record-keeping and reporting obligations on thousands of labor (and other non-profit) organizations with regard to routine inter-affiliate payments that bear little or no connection with public communications about federal elections."

The DISCLOSE Act was opposed by congressional Republicans, who in 2012 filibustered the legislation in the Senate. Republicans such as then-Senate Minority Leader Mitch McConnell contend that the legislation's transparency requirements would violate constitutional free speech rights and are an attempt by Democrats to impose a chilling effect on political giving. The legislation was also opposed by right-wing advocacy organizations, including the Institute for Free Speech, formerly the Center for Competitive Politics, The Heritage Foundation, Americans for Tax Reform, American Conservative Union, CatholicVote.org, and Citizens Against Government Waste, the United States Chamber of Commerce and the National Federation of Independent Business.

The American Civil Liberties Union (ACLU) also expressed opposition in 2010 and 2019 to proposed DISCLOSE Act requirements, arguing that they unnecessarily impinge on free speech rights, subject recipients to "onerous and intrusive disclosure requirements," and adversely impact donor anonymity.

== See also ==
- Interest advocacy
- Independent expenditure
- "Follow the money"
- Political action committee
