= First National Bank of Boston v. Bellotti =

- Supreme Court of the United States

Argued November 9, 1977 Decided April 26, 1978
- Full case name: First National Bank of Boston, et al. v. Francis X. Bellotti, Attorney General of Massachusetts
- Citations: 435 U.S. 765 (more) 98 S. Ct. 1407; 55 L. Ed. 2d 707; 1978 U.S. LEXIS 83
- Argument: Oral argument
- Opinion announcement: Opinion announcement

Case history
- Prior: First Nat. Bank of Bos. v. Attorney Gen., 371 Mass. 773, 359 N.E.2d 1262 (1977)
- Subsequent: Rehearing denied, 438 U.S. 907 (1978).

Holding
- Corporations have a First Amendment right to make contributions in ballot initiative campaigns.

Court membership
- Chief Justice Warren E. Burger Associate Justices William J. Brennan Jr. · Potter Stewart; Byron White · Thurgood Marshall; Harry Blackmun · Lewis F. Powell Jr. William Rehnquist · John P. Stevens

Case opinions
- Majority: Powell, joined by Burger, Stewart, Blackmun, Stevens
- Concurrence: Burger
- Dissent: White, joined by Brennan, Marshall
- Dissent: Rehnquist

Laws applied
- U.S. Const. amend. I

First National Bank of Boston v. Bellotti, 435 U.S. 765 (1978), is a U.S. constitutional law case which defined the free speech right of corporations for the first time. The United States Supreme Court held that corporations have a First Amendment right to make contributions to ballot initiative campaigns. The ruling came in response to a Massachusetts law that prohibited corporate donations in ballot initiatives unless the corporation's interests were directly involved.

In 1976 several corporations, including the First National Bank of Boston, were barred from contributing to a Massachusetts referendum regarding tax policy and subsequently sued. The case was successfully appealed to the Supreme Court, which heard oral arguments in November 1977. On April 26, 1978, the Court ruled 5–4 against the Massachusetts law.

As a result of the ruling, states could no longer impose specific regulations on donations from corporations in ballot initiative campaigns. While the Bellotti decision did not directly affect federal law, it has been cited by other Supreme Court cases such as McConnell v. FEC and Citizens United v. FEC.

== Background ==
=== Corporate funds and federal elections ===
Since the early 1900s, federal law has prohibited the use of corporate funds to influence federal elections. In 1907, Congress passed the Tillman Act, prohibiting corporations and national banks from contributing to federal campaigns. Forty years later, the Taft-Hartley Act banned direct election contributions by labor unions and corporations to federal elections.

In 1971, the Federal Election Campaign Act (FECA) initiated sweeping reforms by requiring full reporting of contributions to federal elections. In 1974, amendments to the FECA created the Federal Election Commission and enacted stricter limits on election contributions and expenditures.

That same year, Buckley v. Valeo (decided in 1976) challenged the 1974 FECA amendments in the U.S. Supreme Court on the grounds that they violated the First Amendment's guarantees of free speech. The Court, introducing the concept of spending money as a form of unrestricted political speech, overturned limits on campaign expenditures. However, it upheld contribution limits because such limits served the government's interest in reducing election corruption.

=== Before the Massachusetts Supreme Court ===
In 1976, Massachusetts passed Massachusetts General Laws ch. 55 § 8, which expanded the 1974 FECA amendment's prohibitions. The new criminal statute disallowed the use of "corporate funds to purchase advertising to influence the outcome of referendum elections, unless the corporation's business interests were directly involved."

That same year, Massachusetts proposed a constitutional amendment (to be voted upon in a referendum election) modifying income tax laws. The First National Bank of Boston, New England Merchants National Bank, the Gillette Co., Digital Equipment Corp., and Wyman-Gordon claimed that this amendment affected their business interests and that they should be allowed to spend corporate funds on relevant advertising. The Massachusetts Attorney General's Office, applying Massachusetts General Laws. ch. 55 § 8, disagreed.

In response, the corporations sued Massachusetts Attorney General Francis Bellotti, the Coalition for Tax Reform, and United Peoples, Inc., contending that Massachusetts General Law ch. 55 § 8 was unconstitutional because it violated their right to free speech. The Supreme Judicial Court of Massachusetts heard The First National Bank of Boston & others v. Attorney General & others on June 8, 1976.

On February 1, 1977, the Massachusetts Supreme Court ruled in favor of the defendants, stating that Massachusetts General Laws ch. 55 § 8 was constitutionally applied because of a failure to find a material effect on the corporations' business interests. The plaintiffs appealed the decision to the United States Supreme Court.

== Before the Supreme Court ==
The U.S. Supreme Court heard First National Bank of Boston et al. v. Bellotti, Attorney General of Massachusetts, on November 9, 1977.

Francis H. Fox presented the oral arguments on behalf the appellant, the First National Bank of Boston in representation of national banking associations and business corporations. E. Susan Garsh joined him on the briefs. Massachusetts Assistant Attorney General Thomas R. Kiley spoke during oral argument for the appellee. The Attorney General Francis X. Bellotti and Assistant Attorney General Stephen Schultz joined him on the brief. Main issues addressed during oral arguments included corporations as persons, the scope of freedom of speech, and the power of the states.

The Associated Industries of Massachusetts, Inc. and the U.S. Chamber of Commerce filed briefs of amici curiae supporting a reversal of the lower courts' ruling. The Federal Election Commission filed briefs of amici curiae supporting an affirmation of the constitutionality of the statue. The State of Montana, the New England Council, and the Pacific Legal Foundation also filed amicus briefs. The Northeastern Legal Foundation's motion to file a brief was denied.

== Opinions of the Court ==
=== Overview ===
The Supreme Court issued its decision on April 26, 1978, with a 5-to-4 majority vote in favor of the First National Bank of Boston. Justice Powell delivered the majority opinion and was joined by Justices Stewart, Blackmun, and Stevens, with Burger writing a separate concurring opinion. Justice White was joined by Justices Brennan and Marshall in his dissent, with Justice Rehnquist issuing a separate dissent. The Supreme Court ruled that corporations have First Amendment speech protections extending beyond material commercial interests, reversing the decision made by the Massachusetts Supreme Court.

=== Majority opinion ===
In opinion written by Justice Powell, the court held:

1. the case was not moot because it was one of a category of cases that is "capable of repetition, yet evading review;"
2. the statute was unconstitutional and the argument that a corporation's speech regarding issues not relevant to the business loses its First Amendment protection is invalid.

In its ruling, the Court first considered whether the case was moot. The constitutional amendment that the appellants had opposed had been defeated by the time the case came to the Court's attention. The Court used the scrutiny described in Weinstein v. Bradford in its determination that the case was not, in fact, moot. The Court's rationale was twofold: first, the interval between the amendment's proposal and its referendum was too short for complete judicial review to have occurred; and second, the Court found that there was a reasonable expectation that the appellants would be adversely affected by the statute again.

Then, the Supreme Court held that the Massachusetts statute in question violated corporate speech rights protected under the First Amendment. The majority wrote that "commercial speech is accorded some constitutional protection not so much because it pertains to the seller's business as because it furthers the societal interest in the 'free flow of commercial information.'"

The majority opinion asserted that "the inherent worth of the speech in terms of its capacity for informing the public does not depend upon the identity of its source, whether corporation, association, union, or individual." In deciding the case, the Court rejected the argument that the Fourteenth Amendment did not apply to corporations. The Court overruled Pierce v. Society of Sisters, which stated that corporations "cannot claim for themselves the liberty which the Fourteenth Amendment guarantees," declaring the decision to be "untenable under decisions of this Court". Instead, the Court asserted that the Due Process Clause extends freedom of speech and other First Amendment liberties to corporate entities.

The majority rejected the argument that the First Amendment rights of a corporation derive purely from their business and property interests. Furthermore, the Court asserted that "the Court's decisions involving corporations in the business of communication or entertainment are based not only on the role of the First Amendment in fostering individual self-expression, but also on its role in affording the public access to discussion, debate, and the dissemination of information and ideas". The Supreme Court cited Virginia State Board of Pharmacy v. Virginia Citizens Consumer Council, in which the Court held that whether "the advertiser's interest in a commercial advertisement is purely economic does not disqualify him from protection under the First and Fourteenth Amendments. Both the individual consumer and society in general may have strong interests in the free flow of commercial information." The Court found that there was no evidence that corporations lost speech protections if their speech did not materially affect the business of the corporation. Thus, the Court held the statute violated the First Amendment rights of the corporation.

The Court also rejected the claim that the statute was "necessitated by governmental interests of the highest order". Massachusetts had argued that the statute was necessary for two reasons: first, that the State had a compelling interest in maintaining the role of the individual in the electoral process and that corporate speech would diminish this; and secondly, to protect shareholders of the corporations whose views might differ from those of the corporate management. The majority asserted that neither of these justifications was apparent in the statute. Furthermore, the decision found that there was insufficient evidence that the law was necessary to satisfy the compelling state interest test. As to the latter claim, the Court held that the statute was both underinclusive and overinclusive in regards to shareholders interests.

=== Concurrence ===
Chief Justice Burger, wrote a separate concurring opinion in order "to raise some questions likely to arise in this area in the future."

Burger wrote to emphasize the difficulty in differentiating media corporations from other corporate entities. He also pointed out that media conglomerates were a more likely threat than the appellants to the public interests raised by the state of Massachusetts, due to their immense influence. Thus, Burger concluded that "no factual distinction has been identified as yet that would justify government restraints on the right of appellants to express their views without, at the same time, opening the door to similar restraints on media conglomerates with their vastly greater influence". Burger pointed out that as newspapers merged with global media conglomerates, separating corporations from media had become untenable. Therefore, Burger argued, restrictions on speech such as the Massachusetts statute necessitated a great deal of caution. "In short," Burger wrote, "the First Amendment does not 'belong' to any definable category of persons or entities: it belongs to all who exercise its freedoms."

=== Dissents ===
A dissenting opinion by Justice White was joined by Justices Brennan and Marshall. In the dissent, White disagreed with the Court's opinion that the statute abridges the speech rights of corporations. "By holding that Massachusetts may not prohibit corporate expenditures or contributions made in connection with referendums involving issues having no material connection with the corporate business," White wrote, "the Court not only invalidates a statute which has been on the books in one form or another for many years, but also casts considerable doubt upon the constitutionality of legislation passed by some 31 States restricting corporate political activity."

White wrote that the Court had erred in not recognizing that the "state's regulatory interests ... were themselves derived from the First Amendment." Specifically, White claimed that "the state had a first amendment interest in 'assuring that shareholders are not compelled to support and financially further beliefs with which they disagree.'" The only purpose uniting all shareholders, White argued, is to make a profit. Any issue not related to business interests could diverge from the interests of individual shareholders.

White also argued that states have the ability to prevent threats from corporate entities to the political process. "The State need not permit its own creation to consume it," White wrote. White noted that the nation had a history of recognizing the need to limit the influence of corporations in the political process, citing United States v. Auto Workers, in which the Court held that the primary purpose of a federal act was "to avoid the deleterious influences on federal elections resulting from the use of money by those who exercise control over large aggregations of capital."

Justice Rehnquist, in a separate dissent, sharply criticized the Court's decision. Rehnquist pointed out that, while the issue of whether corporations had the right to voice their opinions on political issues was new to the Court, the constitutional permissibility of restrictions on such speech had been considered and approved by Congress and over thirty states. He argued that this consensus by so many governmental institutionals should not be ignored in the Court's decision.

Furthermore, Rehnquist claimed that corporate speech is only protected such as it connects to commercial interests. Rehnquist concluded, "although the Court has never explicitly recognized a corporation's right of commercial speech, such a right might be considered necessarily incidental to the business of a commercial corporation. It cannot be so readily concluded that the right of political expression is equally necessary to carry out the functions of a corporation organized for commercial purposes."

Rehnquist asserted that corporate liberties did not include the right to influence and engage in political issues:

I can see no basis for concluding that the liberty of a corporation to engage in political activity with regard to matters having no material effect on its business is necessarily incidental to the purposes for which the Commonwealth permitted these corporations to be organized or admitted within its boundaries. Nor can I disagree with the Supreme Judicial Court's factual finding that no such effect has been shown by these appellants. Because the statute as construed provides at least as much protection as the Fourteenth Amendment requires, I believe it is constitutionally valid.

From this conclusion, Rehnquist argued that the dissemination of information to the public is not diminished by restrictions on corporate speech on political topics. Therefore, in his view, "all natural persons ... remain as free as before to engage in political activity."

== Further Supreme Court rulings ==
In 1990, the Supreme Court in Austin v. Michigan Chamber of Commerce upheld a state law prohibiting corporate independent expenditures, reasoning that the "government has a strong interest in preventing the wealth of corporations from distorting elections for public office." The 2003, Supreme Court majority in McConnell v. Federal Election Commission "relied on Austin" to preserve new federal campaign restrictions of the Bipartisan Campaign Reform Act (2002). In 2010, the Supreme Court in Citizens United v. Federal Election Commission overturned Austin and returned to the principle established in Buckley and Bellotti that "the First Amendment does not allow political speech restrictions based on a speaker's corporate identity."

=== Austin v. Michigan Chamber of Commerce ===
In 1990, the Supreme Court ruled in Austin v. Michigan Chamber of Commerce that even though the First Amendment did protect corporate expression, restrictions on independent expenditure were justified due to the compelling interest to prevent corruption or the appearance of corruption in campaigns. The Austin majority quoted Bellotti in agreeing that political speech did not lose First Amendment protection "merely because the speaker is a corporation." However, the Austin majority held that the Michigan Chamber of Commerce, a non-profit corporation that wanted to publish a newspaper advertisement supporting a candidate, did not qualify for the non-profit exemption established in Federal Election Commission v. Massachusetts Citizens for Life, Inc (1986). The dissent in the Austin case cited the statement in Bellotti that "the legislature is constitutionally disqualified from dictating the subjects about which persons may speak and the speakers who may address a public issue." The dissent found that Massachusetts's law discriminated on the basis of the speaker's identity, and argued that the precedents of the Supreme Court, such as Bellotti, condemn this type of censorship. Scholars agree that the Austin decision was inconsistent with precedent in that the Court had previously never upheld a statue that regulated corporate independent expenditure because of a state interest in preventing corruption.

=== McConnell v. Federal Election Commission ===
In 2002, the Supreme Court in McConnell v. Federal Election Commission upheld the two major provisions of the Bipartisan Campaign Reform Act, which were the bans on unrestricted "soft money" donations to political parties and on electioneering communications, which are defined as any broadcast that refers to a federal candidate and is aired within a designated time frame of that candidate's election. The McConnell majority moved away from the Bellotti decision by allowing such restrictions on corporate donations. The majority accepted legislative judgment that corporate treasuries represent a threat of corruption when deployed directly in candidate elections." The McConnell dissent characterized the Austin argument concerning the "corrosive and distorting effects" of corporations as the notion that corporations "will be able to convince voters on the correctness of their ideas." The dissent argued that using this reasoning, simply "winning the marketplace of ideas" could be considered evidence of corruption. They argued that this conclusion opposed the First amendment, citing the statement from Bellotti that "the fact that advocacy may persuade the electorate is hardly a reason to suppress it."

=== Citizens United v. Federal Election Commission ===
In 2010, the Supreme Court in Citizens United v. Federal Election Commission overturned Austin v. Michigan Chamber of Commerce (1990), portions of McConnell v. Federal Election Commission (2003), and Section 203 of the Bipartisan Campaign Reform Act (2002) that prohibited electioneering communications by corporations. The Harvard Journal of Law and Public Policy described the reasoning of the Citizens majority as based on two propositions. The first was that the Court has recognized that "First Amendment protections extend to corporations," for which the Court cited Bellotti as an example. The Court "returned to the principle established in Buckley and Bellotti that the Government may not suppress political speech based on the speaker's corporate identity." The Court cited Bellotti in arguing that political speech is "indispensable to decision making in a democracy and [that] this is no less true because the speech comes from a corporation." The second proposition addressed contribution expenditure and corruption. The Court ruled that independent expenditure limits were unconstitutional because, unlike campaign contribution limits, they fail to "serve any substantial government interest in stemming the reality or appearance of corruption in the electoral process." The Court argued, "Austin upheld a corporate independent expenditure restriction" by recognizing a "new governmental interest" in preventing corruption to "bypass Buckley and Bellotti." The Court rejected the anti-distortion reasoning argued in Austin and returned to the quid pro quo conception of corruption used in Buckley, stating that "independent expenditures, including those made by corporations, do not give rise to corruption or the appearance of corruption." In overruling Austin, the Citizens majority insisted, "before Austin, the court had not allowed the exclusion of a class of speakers from general public dialogue." The Court did concede that the Bellotti case "did not address the constitutionality" of bans on "corporate independent expenditures to support candidates." However, the court reasoned that such bans "would have been unconstitutional under Bellotti's central principle that the First Amendment does not allow political speech restrictions based on a speaker's corporate identity."

== Effects on policy ==
=== Effects on legislation ===
While the First National Bank of Boston v. Bellotti ruling set a precedent for allowing corporate spending in elections, it did not directly lead to federal campaign law changes because of its narrow focus. The Bellotti decision focused on state referendums, not the election of candidates.

In April 1978, when the Supreme Court decided First National Bank of Boston v. Bellotti, 31 states had laws regulating corporate spending on ballot initiatives. However, not all of these state laws were annulled by the Supreme Court ruling. Universal caps on donations for ballot initiatives as well as specific bans aimed to prevent "undue" corporate influence on referendums were still considered constitutional. Of these 31 states, 18 of them, including Massachusetts, had laws that would be considered unconstitutional after the Bellotti decision.

In the aftermath of Bellotti, several states changed their laws relating to spending on referendums. In 1981, Iowa's state legislature updated their campaign finance laws to state,

It is unlawful for any insurance company, savings and loan association, bank, and or corporation ... to contribute any money, property, labor, or thing of value, directly or indirectly, to any committee, or for the purpose of influencing the vote of any elector, except that such resources may be so expended in connection with a ballot issue, however all such expenditures are subject to the disclosure requirements of this chapter.

Montana had previously banned all corporate donations for or against ballot issues. In October 1978, this law was overturned by the Court of Appeals for the Ninth Circuit citing First National Bank of Boston v. Bellotti.

On December 23, 1986, the General Court of Massachusetts approved a series of changes to its campaign finance laws, and only then officially changed the law governing corporate spending on ballot initiatives. In "An Act Further Regulating Political Campaign Financing," the General Court stated that they were "striking out" Chapter 55, Section 8, the law annulled by the Bellotti decision. Furthermore, a new §8 law was written that in part stated,

No person or persons, no political committee, and no person acting under the authority of a political committee, or in its behalf, other than a political committee organized on behalf of a ballot question campaign ... shall solicit or receive from such corporation or such holders of stock any gift, payment, expenditure, contribution or promise to give, pay, expend or contribute for any such purpose.

=== Effects on referendums ===
Scholars are split on whether the First National Bank of Boston v. Bellotti decision has had an overall effect on the ballot initiative process. Some scholars believe that without any regulations on corporate spending on ballot initiatives, corporations have the potential to donate much more to these campaigns than individuals or citizen groups. Some scholars maintain that this advantage gives corporations undue influence over referendum campaigns and policy outcomes.

One such way corporations can use money to sway voters is through advertising and spreading information about propositions. For example, a California ballot initiative, Proposition 37 from 2012, attracted a disproportionately high level of spending from corporations. The proposition would mandate that all foods containing genetically modified organisms would have to be labeled as such. Corporations including Monsanto and DuPont spent $45 million against Prop 37 - five times more than the money spent by supporters of the proposition. The proposition was defeated by a margin of 51% to 48%, a result that left many pro-Prop 37 groups blaming unfair financing as the reason for the defeat.

Still, other political scientists disagree, believing that there is no definitive evidence that links corporation donations to referendum results. For example, the campaign around California's Proposition 188, a ballot initiative aimed at lifting bans on smoking, is another example of unequal spending between corporations and others. Businesses spent over $19,000,000 in favor of Prop 188, while non-businesses spent less than $2,000,000 in opposition. Nevertheless, in this case, voters ultimately voted against Proposition 188.

Similarly, the gambling industry in California has spent tens of millions of dollars since 1912 on referendums regarding gambling rules. However, only 25% of the referendums they have supported monetarily have passed.

== Support and criticism ==
First National Bank of Boston v. Bellotti (1978), referred to by Linda Greenhouse as "the most important Supreme Court case no one's ever heard of," did not elicit a very strong reaction from the media and the public. Most of the discourse pertaining to the case relates to the decision's effects on the role of money in politics and corporate rights.

=== Support ===
Those who support the Bellotti decision saw it as a culmination of constitutional thinking on the issue of corporate political speech. These scholars and lawyers praise the ruling for treating corporate speech as equal as individual speech and thus increasing the information provided to voters during elections.

According supporters, there is a long history of legislative and judicial decisions that justifies the Bellotti decision. While pre-1900 Supreme Courts believed that corporations did not deserve any protection under the First Amendment, by 1970 some lower courts were beginning to recognize First Amendment protection to "corporate speech." Lawyer Robert Prentice stated that First Amendment protection for corporations has worked its way into the decisions of the Supreme Court since the 1940s, in cases such as Valentine v. Chrestensen (1942), Pittsburgh Press Co. v. Pittsburgh Commission on Human Relations (1973) and Virginia State Pharmacy Board v. Virginia Citizens Consumer Council (1976). From 1973 to Chief Justice Burger's departure in 1986, "the Burger Court ... invalidated every commercial speech ban considered," building up precedents for the Bellotti decision.

Supporters also praise the increase in discourse and available surrounding information about ballot initiatives resulting from the Bellotti decision. Lawyer Francis H. Fox wrote, "[the ruling] perceives that the First Amendment's purposes are better served by allowing the [free] use of means of communication than by enacting legislation designed to foster equality of access to those means." Prentice also noted that the Court acted correctly by protecting the rights of listeners to hear all possible pertinent information. This is the "right to receive" doctrine, which interprets the First Amendment as protecting individuals' right to receive information as part of freedom of communication.

=== Criticisms ===
Critics condemned Bellotti for increasing the influx of corporate money into elections, claiming that this would drown out smaller voices and candidates. Academic George W. Scofield said that corporate speech unrelated to corporate property "becomes the purely personal views of corporate management [and is] undeserving of the constitutional protection afforded by Bellotti."

Former Judge for the United States Court of Appeals for the District of Columbia Circuit J. Skelly Wright said that the rulings in both the First National Bank of Boston v. Bellotti and Buckley v. Valeo cases have "given protection to the polluting effect of money in financial campaigns." Wright advocates for "one person, one vote," a concept that meshes with Scofield's concept of aligning the speech of a corporation and of the individuals composing it.

Some critics point out that commercial interests and public interests are not always aligned, and that investment from corporations for commercial interests can be detrimental to the formation of public opinion. In an article in The New York Times, Linda Greenhouse said, "the court's speech-protective instincts appear increasingly to serve a deregulatory agenda."

Additionally, scholar Carl E. Schneider wrote in the Southern California Law Review that the Court's opinion agreed with previous opinions on the topic of "legislature attempting to govern the political and social power of the business corporation." Schneider writes that the Court misinterpreted the First Amendment and had "problems in understanding social reality."
