= Buckley v. Valeo =

1976 United States Supreme Court case on campaign finance

- Supreme Court of the United States

Argued November 10, 1975 Decided January 30, 1976
- Full case name: James L. Buckley, et al. v. Francis R. Valeo, Secretary of the United States Senate, et al.
- Citations: 424 U.S. 1 (more) 96 S. Ct. 612; 46 L. Ed. 2d 659; 1976 U.S. LEXIS 16; 76-1 U.S. Tax Cas. (CCH) ¶ 9189
- Argument: Oral argument

Case history
- Subsequent: As amended.

Holding
- 1. Some federal limitations on campaign contributions are justified to counteract corruption, but limitations on campaign expenditures are not justified to counteract corruption. On the matter of limiting expenditures, section 608 of the Federal Election Campaign Act of 1971 is unconstitutional because it violates the First Amendment to the Constitution of the United States of America.; 2. The appointment of members of the Federal Election Commission by Congress violates the Appointments Clause as Congress may not appoint officers of the United States

Court membership
- Chief Justice Warren E. Burger Associate Justices William J. Brennan Jr. · Potter Stewart; Byron White · Thurgood Marshall; Harry Blackmun · Lewis F. Powell Jr. William Rehnquist · John P. Stevens

Case opinions
- Majority: Per curiam, joined by Brennan, Stewart, Powell; Marshall (in part); Blackmun (in part); Rehnquist (in part); Burger (in part); White (in part).
- Concur/dissent: Burger
- Concur/dissent: White
- Concur/dissent: Marshall
- Concur/dissent: Blackmun
- Concur/dissent: Rehnquist
- Stevens took no part in the consideration or decision of the case.

Laws applied
- U.S. Const. amend. I, Article II, Sec. 2, cl. 2

Buckley v. Valeo, 424 U.S. 1 (1976), is a landmark decision of the U.S. Supreme Court on campaign finance. A majority of justices held that, as provided by section 608 of the Federal Election Campaign Act of 1971, limits on election expenditures are unconstitutional. In a per curiam (by the Court) opinion, they ruled that expenditure limits contravene the First Amendment provision on freedom of speech because a restriction on spending for political communication necessarily reduces the quantity of expression. It limited disclosure provisions and limited the Federal Election Commission's power. Justice Byron White dissented in part and wrote that Congress had legitimately recognized unlimited election spending as "a mortal danger against which effective preventive and curative steps must be taken".

Buckley v. Valeo was extended by the U.S. Supreme Court in further cases, including in the five to four decision of First National Bank of Boston v. Bellotti in 1978 and Citizens United v. Federal Election Commission in 2010. The latter held that corporations may spend from their general treasuries during elections. In 2014, McCutcheon v. Federal Election Commission held that aggregate limits on political giving by an individual are unconstitutional. By some measures, Buckley is the longest opinion ever issued by the Supreme Court.

== Facts ==
Congress had made previous attempts to regulate campaign finance. It passed the Tillman Act of 1907, and then the Taft–Hartley Act in 1947. Neither was well enforced. In 1974, Congress passed significant amendments to the Federal Election Campaign Act of 1971 (FECA), creating the most comprehensive effort by the federal government to date to regulate federal campaign contributions and spending. President Gerald Ford signed the bill into law on October 15. The key parts of the amended law did the following:

- limited contributions to candidates for federal office (2 USC §441a)
- required the disclosure of political contributions (2 USC §434),
- provided for the public financing of presidential elections (IRC Subtitle H),
- limited expenditures by candidates and associated committees,
- limited independent expenditures to $1,000 (formerly 18 U.S.C. §608e),
- limited candidate expenditures from personal funds (formerly 18 U.S.C. §608a),
- created and fixed the method of appointing members to the Federal Election Commission (FEC) (formerly 2 U.S.C. §437c(a) (1)(A–C)). Eight members of the commission were to be chosen as follows: the Secretary of the Senate and the Clerk of the House of Representatives were ex officio members of the Commission without a right to vote; two members would be appointed by the President pro tempore of the Senate upon recommendations of the majority and minority leaders of the Senate; two would be appointed by the Speaker of the House of Representatives upon recommendations of the majority and minority leaders of the House, and two would be appointed by the President. The six voting members would then need to be confirmed by the majority of both Houses of Congress. In addition, there was a requirement that each of the three appointing authorities was forbidden to choose both of their appointees from the same political party.

The lawsuit was filed in the District Court for the District of Columbia, on January 2, 1975, by U.S. Senator James L. Buckley (a member of the Conservative Party of New York State), former U.S. Senator and 1968 presidential candidate Eugene McCarthy (a Democrat from Minnesota), the New York Civil Liberties Union, the American Conservative Union, the Socialist Workers Party, the Libertarian Party, and numerous other plaintiffs. The named defendant in the caption was Francis R. Valeo, the Secretary of the Senate, an ex officio member of the FEC who represented the U.S. federal government. The trial court denied plaintiffs' request for declaratory and injunctive relief. Plaintiffs then appealed to the Court of Appeals and finally to the Supreme Court.

The plaintiffs argued that the legislation violated the 1st and 5th Amendment rights to freedom of expression and due process, respectively.

== Judgment ==
In a per curiam opinion, the Supreme Court held that several key provisions of the Campaign Finance Act, § 608(a), which limited expenditure by political campaigns, are unconstitutional and contrary to the First Amendment. The major holdings were as follows:

- The Court upheld limits on contributions to candidates.
- The Court upheld limitations on volunteers' incidental expenses.
- The Court upheld the aggregate limit on an individual's total contributions to all candidates and committees in a calendar year.
- The Court struck down limits on expenditures by candidates.
- The Court struck down limits on independent expenditures (i.e., expenditures by other groups or individuals than candidates and political parties).
- The Court upheld mandatory disclosure and reporting provisions, but it narrowed the types of speech to which they could apply.
- The Court upheld a system of voluntary government funding of campaigns, including limits on spending by candidates who choose to accept government subsidies.
- The Court struck down the system by which members of Congress directly appointed Federal Election Commission commissioners.

The Court's opinion begins by stating certain "General Principles", and then dealing with individual parts of the law in turn.

=== General principles ===
- First, the Court cited the importance of the First Amendment issues at stake: "The Act's contribution and expenditure limitations operate in an area of the most fundamental First Amendment activities. Discussion of public issues and debate on the qualifications of candidates are integral to the operation of the system of government established by our Constitution. The First Amendment affords the broadest protection to such political expression in order 'to assure (the) unfettered interchange of ideas for the bringing about of political and social changes desired by the people.'" The Court stated that these issues include "political association as well as political expression."
- The Court rejected the idea that limits on campaign contributions and spending merely limited conduct: "[T]his Court has never suggested that the dependence of a communication on the expenditure of money operates itself to ... reduce the exacting scrutiny required by the First Amendment." The opinion cited New York Times Co. v. Sullivan, and it noted that sending a telegram to a public official—a clearly protected activity—costs money.
- Further, even if considered "conduct", the Court found that "it is beyond dispute that the interest in regulating the alleged 'conduct' of giving or spending money 'arises in some measure because the communication allegedly integral to the conduct is itself thought to be harmful.'"
- The restrictions were not justified under the "times, places, and manner" clause giving the government the authority to regulate elections: The restrictions were "direct quantity restrictions on political communication and association by persons, groups, candidates, and political parties."
- The Court affirmed a First Amendment interest in spending money to facilitate campaign speech, writing, "A restriction on the amount of money a person or group can spend on political communication during a campaign necessarily reduces the quantity of expression by restricting the number of issues discussed, the depth of their exploration, and the size of the audience reached." Further, the law's "$1,000 ceiling on spending 'relative to a clearly identified candidate,' would appear to exclude all citizens and groups except candidates, political parties, and the institutional press from any significant use of the most effective modes of communication." (citations omitted).
- However, "limitation[s] upon the amount that any one person or group may contribute to a candidate or political committee entails only a marginal restriction upon the contributor's ability to engage in free communication", because such persons or groups are free to communicate directly with voters. Nevertheless, "[g]iven the important role of contributions in financing political campaigns, contribution restrictions could have a severe impact on political dialogue if the limitations prevented candidates and political committees from amassing the resources necessary for effective advocacy."
- "The Act's contribution and expenditure limitations also impinge on protected associational freedoms. Making a contribution, like joining a political party, serves to affiliate a person with a candidate."
- Finally, the Court concluded this section by stating, "In sum, although the Act's contribution and expenditure limitations both implicate fundamental First Amendment interests, its expenditure ceilings impose significantly more severe restrictions on protected freedoms of political expression and association than do its limitations on financial contributions."

=== Contribution limits ===
- The Court held that restrictions on "large campaign contributions" are justified by the state's interest in "the prevention of corruption and the appearance of corruption spawned by the real or imagined coercive influence of large financial contributions on candidates' positions and on their actions if elected to office." The Court further defined "corruption" to mean "large contributions ... given to secure a political quid pro quo from current and potential office holders."
- The Court rejected the plaintiffs' claim that all "contribution limitations must be invalidated because bribery laws and narrowly drawn disclosure requirements constitute a less restrictive means of dealing with 'proven and suspected quid pro quo arrangements.'"
- Thus the Court upheld the limits on contributions to candidates and their campaign committees, and to parties and political action committees, in the Act.

=== Expenditure limits ===
- The Court first reiterated that "[t]he Act's expenditure ceilings impose direct and substantial restraints on the quantity of political speech." It reviewed the sweeping scope of the law, noting, "The plain effect of [the Act] is to prohibit all individuals, who are neither candidates nor owners of institutional press facilities, and all groups, except political parties and campaign organizations, from voicing their views 'relative to a clearly identified candidate' through means that entail aggregate expenditures of more than $1,000 during a calendar year. The provision, for example, would make it a federal criminal offense for a person or association to place a single one-quarter page advertisement 'relative to a clearly identified candidate' in a major metropolitan newspaper."
- The Court held that the "key operative language of the provision ... [—]"any expenditure ... relative to a clearly identified candidate"—was unconstitutionally vague, for it "fails to clearly mark the boundary between permissible and impermissible speech, unless other portions of [the Act] make sufficiently explicit the range of expenditures covered by the limitation. The section prohibits 'any expenditure ... relative to a clearly identified candidate during a calendar year which, when added to all other expenditures ... advocating the election or defeat of such candidate, exceeds, $1,000.' (Emphasis added.) This context clearly permits, if indeed it does not require, the phrase "relative to" a candidate to be read to mean 'advocating the election or defeat of' a candidate." The Court elaborated in a footnote that "[t]his construction would restrict the application of [the law] to communications containing express words of advocacy of election or defeat, such as 'vote for,' 'elect,' 'support,' 'cast your ballot for,' 'Smith for Congress,' 'vote against,' 'defeat,' 'reject.'"
- Even after narrowing the scope of the provision, however, the Court found that limits on expenditures are unconstitutional. "We find that the governmental interest in preventing corruption and the appearance of corruption is inadequate to justify s 608(e)(1)'s ceiling on independent expenditures... First, assuming, arguendo, that large independent expenditures pose the same dangers of actual or apparent quid pro quo arrangements as do large contributions, Sec. 608(e)(1) does not provide an answer that sufficiently relates to the elimination of those dangers. Unlike the contribution limitations' total ban on the giving of large amounts of money to candidates, Sec. 608(e)(1) prevents only some large expenditures. So long as persons and groups eschew expenditures that in express terms advocate the election or defeat of a clearly identified candidate, they are free to spend as much as they want to promote the candidate and his views. The exacting interpretation of the statutory language necessary to avoid unconstitutional vagueness thus undermines the limitation's effectiveness as a loophole-closing provision by facilitating circumvention by those seeking to exert improper influence upon a candidate or office-holder."
- "Second, quite apart from the shortcomings ... in preventing any abuses generated by large independent expenditures, the independent advocacy restricted by the provision does not presently appear to pose dangers of real or apparent corruption comparable to those identified with large campaign contributions ... The absence of prearrangement and coordination of an expenditure with the candidate or his agent not only undermines the value of the expenditure to the candidate but also alleviates the danger that expenditures will be given as a quid pro quo for improper commitments from the candidate. Rather than preventing circumvention of the contribution limitations, Sec. 608(e)(1) severely restricts all independent advocacy despite its substantially diminished potential for abuse."
- The Court rejected the notion that a "governmental interest in equalizing the relative ability of individuals and groups to influence the outcome of elections serves to justify the limitation on express advocacy of the election or defeat of candidates imposed by Sec. 608(e)(1)'s expenditure ceiling ... [T]he concept that government may restrict the speech of some elements of our society in order to enhance the relative voice of others is wholly foreign to the First Amendment, which was designed 'to secure "the widest possible dissemination of information from diverse and antagonistic sources,"' and '"to assure unfettered interchange of ideas for the bringing about of political and social changes desired by the people."'"
- Thus, the Court struck down limits on both candidate and independent spending as unconstitutional.

=== Reporting and disclosure requirements ===
- The Court recognized that reporting and disclosure requirements infringe on First Amendment rights. "[W]e have repeatedly found that compelled disclosure, in itself, can seriously infringe on privacy of association and belief guaranteed by the First Amendment."
- However, the Court held that the government has a vital interest in "provid[ing] the electorate with information 'as to where political campaign money comes from and how it is spent by the candidate' in order to aid the voters in evaluating those who seek federal office", a vital interest in allowing "voters to place each candidate in the political spectrum more precisely than is often possible solely on the basis of party labels and campaign speeches." These interests are a result of the fact that "the sources of a candidate's financial support also alert the voter to the interests to which a candidate is most likely to be responsive and thus facilitate predictions of future performance in office." Further, "disclosure requirements deter actual corruption and avoid the appearance of corruption by exposing large contributions and expenditures to the light of publicity." Finally, "recordkeeping, reporting, and disclosure requirements are an essential means of gathering the data necessary to detect violations of the contribution limitations described above."
- However, the Court again found the statute's reach, as written, to be unconstitutionally overbroad. It thus ruled that the Act's disclosure requirements apply to "individuals and groups that are not candidates or political committees only in the following circumstances: (1) when they make contributions earmarked for political purposes or authorized or requested by a candidate or his agent, to some person other than a candidate or political committee, and (2) when they make expenditures for communications that expressly advocate the election or defeat of a clearly identified candidate."

=== Public funding of campaigns ===
- The Court ruled that the government can directly subsidize political campaigns, but that it cannot require candidates to forego private fundraising if they choose the subsidy instead.
- The Court held that the government can condition receipt of the campaign subsidy on a candidate's voluntary agreement to limit his or her total spending.

=== Make-up of FEC ===
- The Court held that the method for appointments to the Federal Election Commission was an unconstitutional violation of separation of powers. The Court opined that these powers could properly be exercised by an "Officer of the United States" (validly appointed under Article II, Section 2, clause 2 of the Constitution) but held that the Commissioners could not exercise this significant authority because they were not "appointed". Id. at 137. Burger and Rehnquist agreed that limits on expenditure are unconstitutional, but dissented otherwise, stating that they would have held much larger parts of the Act to be unconstitutional.

== Dissents ==
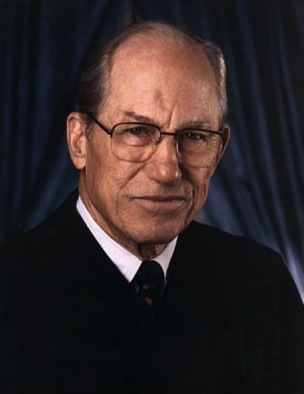
Justice White (above) would have upheld the law's limits on expenditures and contributions.

Although Justice Douglas took part in oral arguments, his resignation intervened and he cast no official vote in the case. Thus, eight justices decided the case. The opinion was a per curiam opinion, that is, not authored by a single justice, but an opinion for the Court. Several justices dissented from portions of the opinion.

Justice White would have upheld all the restrictions on both contributions and expenditures, striking down only the FEC's appointment process. He said the following:

Concededly, neither the limitations on contributions nor those on expenditures directly or indirectly purport to control the content of political speech by candidates or by their supporters or detractors. What the Act regulates is giving and spending money, acts that have First Amendment significance not because they are themselves communicative with respect to the qualifications of the candidate, but because money may be used to defray the expenses of speaking or otherwise communicating about the merits or demerits of federal candidates for election. The act of giving money to political candidates, however, may have illegal or other undesirable consequences: it may be used to secure the express or tacit understanding that the giver will enjoy political favor if the candidate is elected. Both Congress and this Court's cases have recognized this as a mortal danger against which effective preventive and curative steps must be taken.

[...]

I also disagree with the Court's judgment that § 608(a), which limits the amount of money that a candidate or his family may spend on his campaign, violates the Constitution. Although it is true that this provision does not promote any interest in preventing the corruption of candidates, the provision does, nevertheless, serve salutary purposes related to the integrity of federal campaigns. By limiting the importance of personal wealth, § 608(a) helps to assure that only individuals with a modicum of support from others will be viable candidates. This in turn would tend to discourage any notion that the outcome of elections is primarily a function of money. Similarly, § 608(a) tends to equalize access to the political arena, encouraging the less wealthy, unable to bankroll their own campaigns, to run for political office.

Since the contribution and expenditure limitations are neutral as to the content of speech and are not motivated by fear of the consequences of the political speech of particular candidates or of political speech in general, this case depends on whether the nonspeech interests of the Federal Government in regulating the use of money in political campaigns are sufficiently urgent to justify the incidental effects that the limitations visit upon the First Amendment interests of candidates and their supporters.

Justice Marshall dissented on the point of limiting personal contributions and expenditures by a candidate to his or her own campaign – he would have upheld that provision, which was stricken by the Court.

One of the points on which all Members of the Court agree is that money is essential for effective communication in a political campaign. It would appear to follow that the candidate with a substantial personal fortune at his disposal is off to a significant "headstart." Of course, the less wealthy candidate can potentially overcome the disparity in resources through contributions from others. But ability to generate contributions may itself depend upon a showing of a financial base for the campaign or some demonstration of preexisting support, which, in turn, is facilitated by expenditures of substantial personal sums. Thus, the wealthy candidate's immediate access to a substantial personal fortune may give him an initial advantage that his less wealthy opponent can never overcome. And even if the advantage can be overcome, the perception that personal wealth wins elections may not only discourage potential candidates without significant personal wealth from entering the political arena, but also undermine public confidence in the integrity of the electoral process.

Justice Rehnquist dissented on the application of the public funding provisions to minor parties, believing that it was unconstitutional as applied to them.

Justice Blackmun would have held that contribution limits are unconstitutional.

Chief Justice Burger would have held that contribution limits are unconstitutional, that the government financing provisions are unconstitutional, and that disclosure of small contributions to campaigns is unconstitutional.

Justice Stevens arrived on the Court after argument so he did not participate in the decision. However, he said later that he 'always thought that Byron [White] got it right'. Stevens would go on to write the dissent in Citizens United and called for a constitutional amendment to overturn the Court's campaign finance decisions.

== Significance ==
In 2026, The New York Times attributed the ruling as having increased the importance of money in politics and enhanced the influence of the wealthy on politics.

In 2007, the Office of Legal Counsel elaborated on the standard articulated in Buckley, explaining that the Appointments Clause applies to anyone holding a continuing position "to which has been delegated by legal authority a portion of the sovereign powers of the federal government." It further stated that the principal indicator of such "delegated sovereign authority" is the power "to bind third parties, or the government itself, for the public benefit."

== See also ==
- List of United States Supreme Court cases, volume 424
- Bowman v United Kingdom [1998] ECHR 4, (1998) 26 EHRR 1
- Harper v Canada (AG) [2004] SCR 827

== References and further reading ==
- Smith, Craig R. (2003). "Buckley v. Valeo". In Parker, Richard A. (ed.). Free Speech on Trial: Communication Perspectives on Landmark Supreme Court Decisions. Tuscaloosa, Alabama: University of Alabama Press. pp. 203–217. ISBN 0-8173-1301-X.
- Hasen, Richard L. "The Nine Lives of Buckley v. Valeo." (2010). online
- Winter, Ralph K. "The history and theory of Buckley v. Valeo." Journal of Law and Policy 6 (1997): 93+. online
