= Anthony Kennedy =

US Supreme Court justice from 1988 to 2018

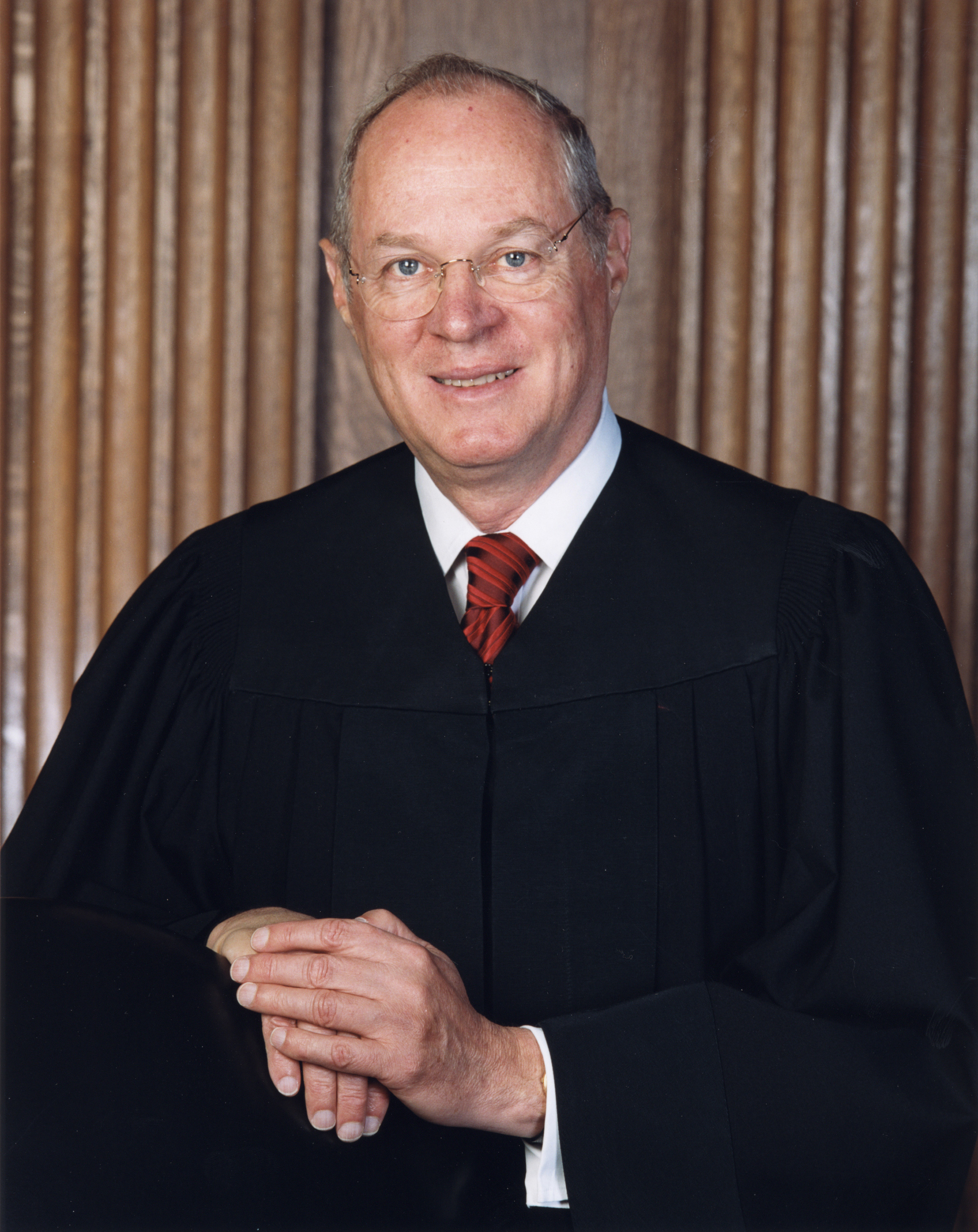
- Official portrait, c. 2005

Associate Justice of the Supreme Court of the United States
- In office February 18, 1988 – July 31, 2018
- Nominated by: Ronald Reagan
- Preceded by: Lewis F. Powell Jr.
- Succeeded by: Brett Kavanaugh

Judge of the United States Court of Appeals for the Ninth Circuit
- In office March 24, 1975 – February 18, 1988
- Appointed by: Gerald Ford
- Preceded by: Charles Merton Merrill
- Succeeded by: Pamela Ann Rymer

Personal details
- Born: Anthony McLeod Kennedy; July 23, 1936 (age 90) Sacramento, California, U.S.
- Spouse: Mary Davis (m. 1963)
- Children: 3
- Education: Stanford University (BA); Harvard University (LLB)
- Awards: Henry J. Friendly Medal (2019)

Military service
- Allegiance: United States
- Branch/service: United States Army
- Years of service: 1961–1962
- Rank: Private (first class)
- Unit: California Army National Guard
- Kennedy's voice Kennedy delivering the decision of House v. Bell. Recorded June 12, 2006

Anthony McLeod Kennedy (born July 23, 1936) is an American lawyer who served as an associate justice of the Supreme Court of the United States from 1988 until his retirement in 2018. He was nominated to the court in 1987 by President Ronald Reagan, and after being unanimously confirmed by the U.S. Senate was sworn in on February 18, 1988. After the retirement of Sandra Day O'Connor in 2006, he was considered the swing vote on many of the Roberts Court's 5–4 decisions.

Born in Sacramento, California, Kennedy took over his father's legal practice in Sacramento after graduating from Stanford University and Harvard Law School. Kennedy became a U.S. federal judge in 1975 when President Gerald Ford appointed him to the United States Court of Appeals for the Ninth Circuit. In November 1987, after two failed attempts at nominating a successor to Associate Justice Lewis F. Powell Jr., President Reagan nominated Kennedy to the Supreme Court. Kennedy won unanimous confirmation from the United States Senate in February 1988. Following the death of Antonin Scalia in February 2016, Kennedy became the senior associate justice of the court. Kennedy retired during Donald Trump's first term and was succeeded by his former law clerk, Brett Kavanaugh. Following O'Connor's death in 2023, Kennedy is the oldest living former Supreme Court justice.

Kennedy authored the majority opinion in several important cases—including Boumediene v. Bush, Citizens United v. FEC, and four major gay rights cases: Romer v. Evans, Lawrence v. Texas, United States v. Windsor, and Obergefell v. Hodges. He also co-authored the controlling opinion in Planned Parenthood v. Casey along with Justices Sandra Day O’Connor and David Souter.

== Early life and education ==
Kennedy was born and raised in a Catholic family in Sacramento, California. His ancestry was mainly Irish, with some Scottish, German, and English ancestry as well. He was the son of Anthony J. Kennedy (1902–1963), an attorney with a reputation for influence in the California State Legislature, and Gladys (née McLeod; 1904–1981), who participated in many local civic activities. As a boy, Kennedy came into contact with prominent politicians of the day, such as California governor and future chief justice of the United States Earl Warren. As a young man, Kennedy served as a page in the California State Senate. Kennedy attended C. K. McClatchy High School, where he was an honors student and graduated in 1954.

Following in his mother's footsteps, Kennedy enrolled at Stanford University where he developed an interest in constitutional law. After spending his senior year at the London School of Economics, Kennedy graduated Phi Beta Kappa from Stanford in 1958 with a Bachelor of Arts degree in political science. Kennedy then attended Harvard Law School, graduating in 1961 with a Bachelor of Laws, cum laude.

== Legal career ==
Kennedy was in private practice in San Francisco from 1961 to 1963. In 1963, following his father's death, he took over his father's Sacramento practice, which he operated until 1975. From 1965 to 1988, he was a professor of constitutional law at McGeorge School of Law, at the University of the Pacific.

During Kennedy's time as a California law professor and attorney, he helped California Governor Ronald Reagan draft a state tax proposal.

Kennedy served as a private first class in the California Army National Guard from 1961 to 1962 during the Cold War. He was on the board of the Federal Judicial Center from 1987 to 1988. He also served on two committees of the Judicial Conference of the United States: the Advisory Panel on Financial Disclosure Reports and Judicial Activities (subsequently renamed the Advisory Committee on Codes of Conduct) from 1979 to 1987, and the Committee on Pacific Territories from 1979 to 1990, which he chaired from 1982 to 1990.

== U.S. Court of Appeals for the Ninth Circuit ==
On March 3, 1975, upon Reagan's recommendation, President Gerald Ford nominated Kennedy to the seat on the United States Court of Appeals for the Ninth Circuit that had been vacated by Charles Merton Merrill. Kennedy was unanimously confirmed by the U.S. Senate on March 20 and received his commission on March 24, 1975.

== Supreme Court of the United States ==
=== Nomination and confirmation ===
In July 1987, President Ronald Reagan nominated Robert Bork to the Supreme Court seat vacated by Lewis F. Powell Jr., who had announced his retirement in late June. However, he was rejected 42–58 by the Senate on October 23. The president's next nominee, Douglas Ginsburg, withdrew his name from consideration on November 7 after admitting to marijuana use, and Senate Judiciary Committee member Patrick Leahy said that if Reagan's next nominee was unacceptable to Senate Democrats, (Note: Several proposed nominees were noted as unacceptable immediately following Bork's rejection, with Pasco Bowman II and John Clifford Wallace most emphatically declared unacceptable.) they would refuse hearings for any candidate until after the 1988 presidential election.

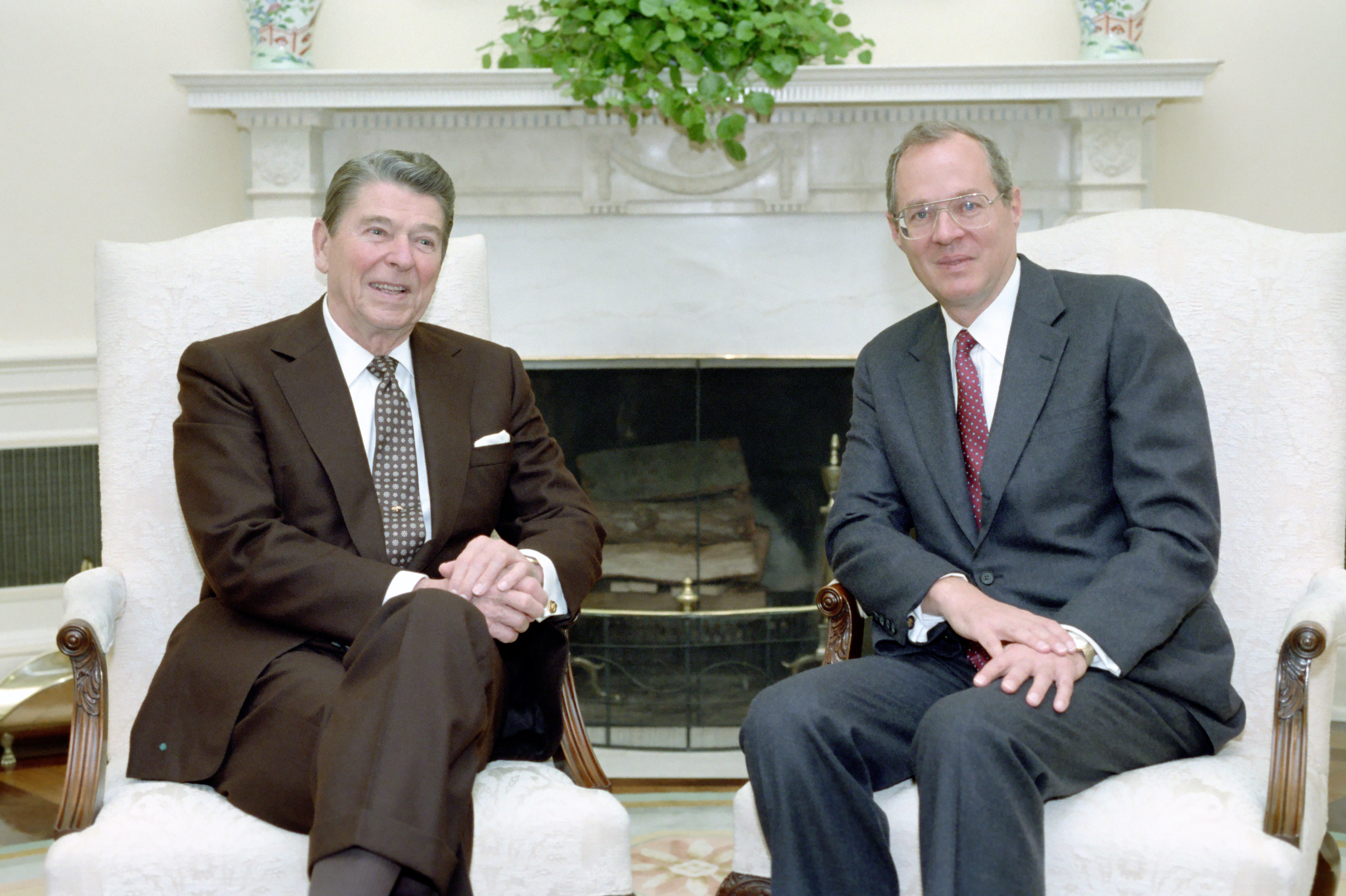
President Reagan and Kennedy meeting in the Oval Office on November 11, 1987

On November 11, 1987, Reagan nominated Anthony Kennedy to fill Powell's seat. Kennedy was then subjected to an unprecedentedly thorough investigation of his background, which did not uncover any information that would hinder his nomination.

In a Ninth Circuit dissent that Kennedy wrote before joining the Supreme Court, he criticized police for bribing a child into showing them where the child's mother hid drugs. Considering such conduct offensive and destructive of the family, Kennedy wrote that "indifference to personal liberty is but the precursor of the state's hostility to it." Kennedy wrote an article the year before, however, about judicial restraint, and the following excerpt from it was read aloud by Jeffrey Levi, executive director of the National Gay & Lesbian Taskforce, at his confirmation hearing:

One can conclude that certain essential, or fundamental, rights should exist in any just society. It does not follow that each of those essential rights is one that we as judges can enforce under the written Constitution. The Due Process Clause is not a guarantee of every right that should inhere in an ideal system. Many argue that a just society grants a right to engage in homosexual conduct. If that view is accepted, the Bowers decision in effect says the State of Georgia has the right to make a wrong decision—wrong in the sense that it violates some people's views of rights in a just society. We can extend that slightly to say that Georgia's right to be wrong in matters not specifically controlled by the Constitution is a necessary component of its own political processes. Its citizens have the political liberty to direct the governmental process to make decisions that might be wrong in the ideal sense, subject to correction in the ordinary political process.

Kennedy said about Griswold v. Connecticut, a privacy case about the use of contraceptives, "I really think I would like to draw the line and not talk about the Griswold case so far as its reasoning or its result." He also discussed "a zone of liberty, a zone of protection, a line that's drawn where the individual can tell the Government, 'Beyond this line you may not go.'"

His hearings before the Senate Judiciary Committee began on December 14, and lasted just three consecutive days. When the Senate voted on Kennedy's nomination, he received bipartisan support. Maureen Hoch of PBS wrote that he "virtually sailed through the confirmation process and was widely viewed by conservatives and liberals alike as balanced and fair". The U.S. Senate confirmed him on February 3, 1988, by a vote of 97 to 0; he is the most recent Supreme Court justice to be confirmed by a unanimous vote. Absent from the vote were three Democrats: Paul Simon and Al Gore were campaigning and Joe Biden was ill. Attorney General Edwin Meese presented Kennedy's commission to the court in a swearing-in ceremony on February 18, 1988.

=== Tenure and analysis ===
Although appointed by a Republican president, Kennedy's decisions did not consistently align with a single ideological bloc and often varied depending on the case. Vanity Fair quoted several former Supreme Court clerks as indicating that they believe Kennedy was often swayed by the opinions of his clerks, including his ruling on Planned Parenthood v. Casey. One clerk stated that "the premise is that he can't think by himself, and that he can be manipulated by someone in his second year of law school". This notion also led the Federalist Society to target Kennedy with more conservative clerks, believing this would make Kennedy more conservative. Two of his former clerks, Neil Gorsuch and Brett Kavanaugh, eventually became Supreme Court justices. Conservative pundit George Will and Georgetown University Law Center professor Randy Barnett have described Kennedy's jurisprudence as "libertarian", although other legal scholars have disagreed.

Kennedy issued conservative rulings during most of his tenure, having voted with William Rehnquist as often as any other justice from 1992 to the end of the Rehnquist Court in 2005. In his first term on the Court, Kennedy voted with Rehnquist 92 percent of the time—more than any other justice. Before becoming the median justice on the court in 2006, Kennedy sided with conservatives during close rulings 75 percent of the time. However, Kennedy was also known for siding with the court's liberal justices on high-profile social issues like same-sex marriage and abortion. Kennedy was known as a swing vote on the court, and this reputation became more pronounced after the 2006 retirement of Justice Sandra Day O'Connor (who had previously been known as the court's primary swing vote). Kennedy, who was slightly more conservative than former Justice O'Connor was on issues of race, religion, and abortion, intensely disliked being labeled a "swing vote" in public. However, interviews with former clerks indicate that, behind the scenes, he may have appeared undecided on certain cases despite having already formed an opinion.

On the Roberts Court, Kennedy often decided the outcome of cases. In the 2008–2009 term, he was in the majority 92 percent of the time. In the 23 decisions in which the justices split 5–4, Kennedy was in the majority in all but five. Of those 23 decisions, 16 were strictly along ideological lines, and Kennedy joined the conservative wing of the court 11 times; the liberals, five. In the 2010–2011 term, 16 cases were decided by a 5–4 vote; Kennedy joined the majority in 14 of the decisions.

Following the death of Antonin Scalia in February 2016, Kennedy became the Senior Associate Justice of the court and the last appointed by President Reagan. During his last few terms on the court, the justice became critical of administrative law. Kennedy retired from the Supreme Court and made the transition to senior status effective July 31, 2018.

He has the distinction of being the only Supreme Court Justice to have two former clerks of his be appointed to the Supreme Court, Neil Gorsuch and Brett Kavanaugh. He also has the distinction of being the only justice to serve alongside a former clerk, that being Gorsuch.

==== Conservative criticism ====
According to legal reporter Jan Crawford, Kennedy attracted the ire of conservatives when he did not vote with his more conservative colleagues. In 2005, the U.S. House Majority Leader at the time, Tom DeLay, criticized Kennedy for his reliance on international law and for conducting his own Internet research, calling him a judicial activist. According to legal analyst Jeffrey Toobin, some conservatives viewed Kennedy's pro-gay-rights and pro-choice rulings as betrayals. According to Crawford, the "bitter" quality of some movement conservatives' views on Kennedy stems from his eventual rethinking of positions on abortion, religion, and the death penalty (which Kennedy believes cannot be constitutionally applied to juveniles or intellectually disabled people).

A short 2008 law review article by retired lawyer Douglas M. Parker in The Green Bag charged that much of the criticism of Kennedy was based upon "pop psychology" rather than careful analysis of his opinions. Kennedy himself responds to concerns about judicial activism this way: "An activist court is a court that makes a decision you don't like."

==== Internationalism ====
According to The New Yorker staff writer Jeffrey Toobin, starting in 2003, Kennedy became a leading proponent of the use of foreign and international law as an aid to interpreting the United States Constitution. Toobin sees this consideration of foreign law as the biggest factor behind Kennedy's occasional breaking with his most conservative colleagues. The use of foreign law in Supreme Court opinions dates back to at least 1829, though according to Toobin, its use in interpreting the Constitution on "basic questions of individual liberties" began only in the late 1990s.

Defending his use of international law, in 2005 Kennedy told Toobin, "Why should world opinion care that the American Administration wants to bring freedom to oppressed peoples? Is that not because there's some underlying common mutual interest, some underlying common shared idea, some underlying common shared aspiration, underlying unified concept of what human dignity means? I think that's what we're trying to tell the rest of the world, anyway."

A 2008 profile of Kennedy in the Los Angeles Times focused on his internationalist perspective. According to David Savage, Kennedy had become a strong proponent of interpreting the guarantees of liberty and equality in line with modern human rights law: "lawyers and judges have come to believe the basic principles of human rights are common to the peoples of world [sic]."

== Jurisprudence ==
=== Abortion ===
In Hodgson v. Minnesota, 497 U.S. 417 (1990), Kennedy voted to uphold a restriction on abortion for minors that required both parents to be notified about the procedure.

Kennedy co-authored the plurality opinion in Planned Parenthood v. Casey (1992), which reaffirmed in principle (though without many details) the Roe v. Wade decision recognizing the right to abortion under the Due Process Clause of the Fourteenth Amendment. The plurality opinion, signed jointly by three justices appointed by Ronald Reagan and George H. W. Bush, ignited a firestorm of criticism from conservatives. Kennedy had stated at least as early as 1989 that, in order to uphold precedent, he might not vote to overturn Roe. According to Court insiders, Kennedy had reportedly considered overturning Roe, but in the end decided to uphold restrictions while affirming the Roe precedent.

In later abortion decisions, it became apparent that Kennedy thought Casey had narrowed Roe and allowed more restrictions. Owing to the Court's altered composition under President Clinton, Kennedy was no longer the fifth vote to strike down abortion restrictions. Hence, O'Connor became the justice who defined the meaning of Casey in subsequent cases, while Kennedy often dissented, expressing his interpretation of Casey as allowing for certain restrictions. For example, Kennedy dissented in the 2000 decision in Stenberg v. Carhart, which struck down laws criminalizing partial-birth abortion.

After the judicial appointments made by President George W. Bush, Kennedy again became the needed fifth vote to strike down abortion restrictions. Since Kennedy's conception of abortion rights was narrower than O'Connor's, the court became slightly more supportive of abortion restrictions after 2006. Kennedy wrote the majority opinion in Gonzales v. Carhart, 550 U.S. 124 (2007), which held that a federal law criminalizing partial-birth abortion did not violate Casey because it did not impose an "undue burden" upon the exercise of abortion rights. The decision did not expressly overrule Stenberg, although many commentators saw it as having that effect.

=== First amendment rights of contractors ===
O'Hare Truck Service, Inc. was a towing company employed under contract by the City of Northlake in northern Illinois. Northlake removed O'Hare from its list on towing companies because the company's owner did not support Northlake's mayoral candidate in his reelection campaign: instead, the owner supported an opposition candidate. The Supreme Court held, in a majority 7–2 opinion written by Kennedy (O'Hare Truck Service, Inc. v. City of Northlake), that independent contractors such as O'Hare are entitled to the same First Amendment protections as those afforded to government employees. Accordingly, Northlake could not base the towing company's employment on its political affiliations or beliefs unless the city could demonstrate that their political affiliations "had a reasonable and appreciable effect on its job performance". The Court held that Northlake neither attempted nor would it have been able to make such a demonstration. Therefore, Northlake's removal of O'Hare Truck Service from its employment list was unconstitutional.

=== Free speech ===
On May 30, 2006, Kennedy wrote the majority opinion in Garcetti v. Ceballos relating to whether the First Amendment protects statements by public officials pursuant to their duties from employer discipline. Kennedy utilized past precedents in Pickering v. Board of Education to determine whether or not an employee spoke as a citizen on a matter of public concern or in the capacity of his office. Upon the identification that speech was said in an official capacity, Kennedy determined that a government entity, in its role as an employer, had the discretion to impose speech restrictions so long as they had the potential to affect its operations. Kennedy emphasized this point by writing: "when public employees make statements pursuant to their official duties, the employees are not speaking as citizens for First Amendment purposes, and the Constitution does not insulate their communications from employer discipline".

On June 28, 2012, Kennedy wrote the plurality opinion in United States v. Alvarez declaring the Stolen Valor Act unconstitutional. In doing so, Kennedy determined the Act supported a content-based restriction on speech - that being a nondefamatory falsehood of having received a military decoration or medal - and that the government failed to provide a direct causal link between the restriction and a potential injury. Additionally, Kennedy wrote that such a restriction failed to meet the standards of strict scrutiny, with the law acting to "[seek] to control and suppress all false statements on this one subject in almost limitless times and settings".

On June 19, 2017, Kennedy wrote the majority opinion in Packingham v. North Carolina ruling that a prohibition of sex offenders from social media is a violation of the First Amendment. Kennedy noted that, while the restriction was tailored to suit a government interest in preventing child sex abuse, the law did not pass strict scrutiny nor was it narrowly tailored for that purpose. The barring of a substantial amount of online expression was therefore unrelated to its stated goal and acted "to foreclose access to social media altogether [and] to prevent the user from engaging in the legitimate exercise of First Amendment rights".

=== Capital punishment ===
With the Court's majority in Atkins v. Virginia and Roper v. Simmons, Kennedy agreed that the execution of the mentally ill and those under 18 at the time of the crime was unconstitutional. In Kansas v. Marsh, however, Kennedy did not join the dissent, which raised concerns about the administration of capital punishment.

In 2008, Kennedy wrote the majority opinion in Kennedy v. Louisiana. The opinion, joined by the court's four more liberal justices, held, "[t]he Eighth Amendment bars Louisiana from imposing the death penalty for the rape of a child where the crime did not result, and was not intended to result, in the victim's death." The opinion went on to state that "there is a distinction between intentional first-degree murder on the one hand and nonhomicide crimes against individual persons, even including child rape, on the other. The latter crimes may be devastating in their harm, as here, but in 'terms of moral depravity and of the injury to the person and to the public' ... they cannot be compared to murder in their 'severity and irrevocability'." The opinion concluded that in cases of crimes against individuals, "the death penalty should not be expanded to instances where the victim's life was not taken".

=== Environment ===
Kennedy wrote the majority decision in Coeur Alaska, Inc. v. Southeast Alaska Conservation Council (2009), which involved an Alaskan mining company that planned to extract new gold from a mine that had been closed for decades using a technique known as "froth-flotation". This technique would produce approximately 4.5 million tons of "slurry", a thick waste product laced with toxic elements such as lead and mercury. The company intended to dispose of the waste in a nearby lake, which would eventually decrease the depth of the lake by fifty feet and flood the surrounding land with contaminated water. While federal law forbids "[t]he use of any river, lake, stream or ocean as a waste treatment system", Kennedy's decision stated that pollutants are exempt from this law so long as they have "the effect of ... changing the bottom elevation of water". Justice Ginsburg's dissent stated that such a reading of federal law "strains credulity" because it allows "[w]hole categories of regulated industries" to "gain immunity from a variety of pollution-control standards".

=== Gay rights and homosexuality ===
Kennedy's concept of liberty has included protections for sexual orientation. While Kennedy was an appeals-court judge, he wrote a decision in Beller v. Middendorf (9th Cir. 1980) that noted that some homosexual behavior may be constitutionally protected – yet upheld the military's policy of discharging service members on the basis of homosexuality. He later wrote the Supreme Court's opinion in Romer v. Evans (1996), invalidating a provision in the Colorado Constitution excluding homosexuals from any state or local anti-discrimination protections. He wrote the Court's opinion in Lawrence v. Texas (2003), which invalidated criminal laws against homosexual sodomy on the basis of the Due Process Clause of the United States Constitution, overturning the Court's previous ruling in Bowers v. Hardwick (1986). In both cases, he sided with the more liberal members of the Court. He wrote that the Court had misread the historical record regarding laws criminalizing homosexual relations in Bowers, stating that further research showed that American anti-sodomy laws had historically been directed at "nonprocreative sexual activity more generally", rather than specifically at homosexual acts. Combined with the fact that such laws had often gone unenforced, the Court saw this as constituting a tradition of avoiding interference with private sexual activity between consenting adults. He also said that the reasoning behind Bowers was not widely accepted in American law (pointing, for example, to the Model Penal Code's recommendations starting in 1955) and that it had been rejected by most other developed Western countries (as in the Wolfenden Report of 1957 and a 1981 decision of the European Court of Human Rights in Case 7525/76, Dudgeon v United Kingdom). As a result, Kennedy stated that there was a jurisprudential basis for thinking that "an integral part of human freedom" is allowing consenting adults to choose to privately engage in sexual activity.

In the 2000 case of Boy Scouts of America v. Dale, Kennedy voted, with four other justices, to uphold the Boy Scouts of America's organizational right to ban homosexuals from being scoutmasters.

On October 19, 2009, Kennedy temporarily blocked Washington state officials from releasing the names of people who signed petitions calling for a referendum ballot measure that would repeal a gay rights domestic partnership law, but joined the subsequent majority decision in Doe v. Reed, which stated the Washington law permitting signature release was constitutional, but remanded the matter to the lower court to determine whether the release of this particular petition's signatures was constitutional.

In Christian Legal Society v. Martinez (2010), the Court held that a public law college's policy requiring that all student organizations allow any student to join was constitutional. The Christian Legal Society wanted an exemption from the policy because the organization barred students based on religion and sexual orientation. Hastings College of Law refused to grant the exemption. The court found that Hastings' policy was reasonable and viewpoint neutral. Kennedy wrote a concurrence joining the majority.

On June 26, 2013, Section 3 of the Defense of Marriage Act was held unconstitutional in United States v. Windsor. In the majority opinion on this case, Kennedy wrote, "The federal statute is invalid, for no legitimate purpose overcomes the purpose and effect to disparage and injure those whom the State, by its marriage laws, sought to protect in personhood and dignity. By seeking to displace this protection and treating those persons as living in marriages less respected than others, the federal statute is in violation of the Fifth Amendment."

Two years later, Kennedy authored the majority ruling in the decision of Obergefell v. Hodges, which holds that same-sex couples must be allowed to marry nationwide. The closing paragraph of Kennedy's ruling has been used by many couples in their marriage vows:

No union is more profound than marriage, for it embodies the highest ideals of love, fidelity, devotion, sacrifice and family. In forming a marital union, two people become something greater than once they were.

=== Gun issues ===
On June 26, 2008, Kennedy joined the majority in District of Columbia v. Heller, which struck down the ban on handguns in the District of Columbia. At issue was whether Washington, D.C.'s ban violated the right to "keep and bear arms" by preventing individuals from having guns in their homes. Kennedy sided with the conservatives on the Court, holding that the Second Amendment recognized an individual's right to keep and bear arms. Two years later, in McDonald v. Chicago, Kennedy joined the majority opinion holding that the Second Amendment's protections for the right to keep and bear arms are incorporated against the states through the Due Process Clause of the Fourteenth Amendment.

=== Habeas corpus ===
On June 12, 2008, Kennedy wrote the 5–4 majority opinion in Boumediene v. Bush. The case challenged the legality of Lakhdar Boumediene's detention at the Guantanamo Bay military base as well as the constitutionality of the Military Commissions Act (MCA) of 2006. Kennedy was joined by the four more liberal justices in finding that the constitutionally guaranteed right of habeas corpus applies to persons held in Guantanamo Bay and to persons designated as enemy combatants on that territory. They also found that the Detainee Treatment Act of 2005 failed to provide an adequate substitute for habeas corpus and that the MCA was an unconstitutional suspension of that right.

The court also concluded that the detainees are not required to exhaust review procedures in the court of appeals before seeking habeas relief in the district court. In the ruling, Kennedy called the Combatant Status Review Tribunals "inadequate". He explained, "to hold that the political branches may switch the constitution on or off at will would lead to a regime in which they, not this court, 'say what the law is'". The decision struck down section seven of the MCA but left intact the Detainee Treatment Act. In a concurring opinion, Justice Souter stressed the fact that the prisoners involved had been imprisoned for as long as six years.

=== Religious liberty ===
On issues of religion, Kennedy held to a less separationist reading of the Establishment Clause than did his colleague, Justice Sandra Day O'Connor, favoring a "Coercion Test" that he detailed in County of Allegheny v. ACLU. Kennedy authored the majority opinion in Town of Greece v. Galloway, 572 U.S. 565 (2014), concluding, "The town of Greece does not violate the First Amendment by opening its meetings with prayer that comports with our tradition, and does not coerce participation by nonadherents."

=== Super PACs ===
Justice Kennedy's majority opinion in Citizens United found that the BCRA §203 prohibition of all independent expenditures by corporations and unions violated the First Amendment's protection of free speech. The majority wrote, "If the First Amendment has any force, it prohibits Congress from fining or jailing citizens, or associations of citizens, for simply engaging in political speech."

Justice Kennedy's opinion for the majority also noted that because the First Amendment does not distinguish between media and other corporations, these restrictions would allow Congress to suppress political speech in newspapers, books, television, and blogs. The court overruled Austin v. Michigan Chamber of Commerce (1990), which had held that a state law that prohibited corporations from using treasury money to support or oppose candidates in elections did not violate the First and Fourteenth Amendments. The Court also overruled that portion of McConnell v. FEC (2003) that upheld BCRA's restriction of corporate spending on "electioneering communications". The Court's ruling effectively freed corporations and unions to spend money both on "electioneering communications" and to directly advocate for the election or defeat of candidates (although not to contribute directly to candidates or political parties).

On October 25, 2011, Richard L. Hasen wrote that in the 2012 election super PACs "will likely replace political parties as a conduit for large, often secret contributions, allowing an end run around the $2,500 individual contribution limit and the bar on corporate and labor contributions to federal candidates". According to Hasen, the rise of super PACs dates to a sentence in Kennedy's opinion in Citizens United: "We now conclude that independent expenditures, including those made by corporations, do not give rise to corruption or the appearance of corruption." Kennedy also wrote in his opinion that he was not concerned if higher expenditures by people or corporations were viewed as leading to corruption, stating, "the appearance of influence or access will not cause the electorate to lose faith in this democracy."

=== Other issues ===
On the issue of the limits of free speech, Kennedy joined a majority to protect flag burning in the controversial case of Texas v. Johnson (1989). In his concurrence, Kennedy wrote, "It is poignant but fundamental that the flag protects those who hold it in contempt." He took a very broad view of constitutional protection for speech under the First Amendment, invalidating a congressional law prohibiting "virtual" child pornography in Ashcroft v. Free Speech Coalition (2002).

Kennedy has joined with court majorities in decisions favoring states' rights and invalidating federal and state affirmative action programs. He ruled with the majority on Equal Protection grounds in the controversial 2000 Bush v. Gore case that halted continuing recounts in the 2000 presidential election and ended the legal challenge to the election of President George W. Bush. Although the decision was published without an author, Kennedy wrote the decision. Behind the scenes, colleagues criticized his professionalism in this case, feeling that he inflated the numbers of his majority opinion by deciding, without consulting the dissenting justices, to implicate some of the dissenters as having joined his opinion in part.

In the 2005 Gonzales v. Raich case, he joined the liberal members of the Court (along with conservative Justice Scalia) in permitting the federal government to prohibit the use of medical marijuana, even in states where it is legal. Several weeks later, in the controversial case of Kelo v. City of New London (2005), he joined the four more liberal justices in supporting the local government's power to take private property for economic development through the use of eminent domain.

In Norfolk & Western Railway Co. v. Ayers (2003), Kennedy wrote a partial dissent in which he argued that railroad workers who had contracted asbestosis from their employment should not be entitled to recovery for the emotional pain and suffering from their increased risk of cancer.

In Baze v. Rees, Kennedy played a deciding role in the outcome of lethal injection. Some correspondents believed he would play a larger role, believing more than two judges would dissent.

A December 2011 article in the Huffington Post noted that Kennedy in Melendez-Diaz v. Massachusetts (2009) and Bullcoming v. New Mexico (2011) dissented on an interpretation of the Sixth Amendment right to confront witnesses, where a lab tech who created a forensic report on a case is required to testify at trial if called. His dissents, joined by Roberts, Breyer, and Alito, claimed that the rule would place a burden on understaffed labs. However, in Williams v. Illinois, Kennedy sided with Scalia's interpretation of the amendment.

== Public speaking and teaching ==
Kennedy called for reform of overcrowded American prisons in a speech before the American Bar Association. He has spent his summers in Salzburg, Austria, where he teaches international and American law at the University of Salzburg for the McGeorge School of Law international program and has attended the large yearly international judges' conference held there.

In 1994, Kennedy ran a series of mock trials of Shakespeare's character Hamlet, for his murder of Polonius. Alan Stone was a psychiatric witness for the prosecution, tasked with fighting against an insanity defense. The juries usually deadlocked.

In 2005, Kennedy received the Golden Plate Award of the American Academy of Achievement presented by Awards Council member Sir Roger Bannister.

In January 2015, Kennedy recorded a short interview for Historic Mount Vernon about the vital role George Washington had played in the drafting and early interpretation of the Constitution.

== Personal life ==
On June 23, 1963, Kennedy married Mary Jeanne Davis from Sacramento, California. The Kennedys have three children: Justin, Gregory, and Kristin. Mary Kennedy and the three Kennedy children are all graduates of Stanford.

Mary Kennedy was a third grade teacher at the Golden Empire Elementary School in Sacramento.

Justin Kennedy worked for Goldman Sachs, and then for Deutsche Bank from 1997 to 2009; he became its global head of real estate capital markets. During his time at Deutsche Bank he helped Donald Trump secure a $640 million loan for a Chicago real estate project.

Gregory attended Stanford Law School and was a president of the Stanford Federalist Society. He was an associate at Sullivan & Cromwell in the 1990s, later worked at UBS, and, since October 2016, is the chief operating officer at the investment bank Disruptive Technology Advisers, which works closely with Dropbox, 23andMe, and Peter Thiel's Palantir Technologies.

Kennedy is one of 15 Catholics to have served on the Supreme Court (out of a total of 116 justices).

Kennedy released a memoir in 2025 entitled Life, Law & Liberty (ISBN 9781668052747).

== See also ==
- List of justices of the Supreme Court of the United States
- List of law clerks for the first seat of the Supreme Court of the United States
- List of United States Supreme Court justices by time in office
- List of United States federal judges by longevity of service
- United States Supreme Court cases during the Rehnquist Court
- United States Supreme Court cases during the Roberts Court

== Sources ==
- Nowak, John E.; Rotunda, Ronald D. (2012). Treatise on Constitutional Law: Substance and Procedure (5th ed.). Eagan, Minnesota: West Thomson/Reuters. OCLC 798148265.

Legal offices
Preceded by Charles Merton Merrill	Judge of the United States Court of Appeals for the Ninth Circuit; 1975–1988	Succeeded by Pamela Ann Rymer
Preceded by Lewis F. Powell Jr.	Associate Justice of the Supreme Court of the United States; 1988–2018	Succeeded by Brett Kavanaugh
U.S. order of precedence (ceremonial)
Preceded by Ketanji Brown Jackson as Associate Justice of the Supreme Court	Order of precedence of the United States as Retired Associate Justice of the Supreme Court	Succeeded by Stephen Breyer as Retired Associate Justice of the Supreme Court
