= Citizens United v. FEC =

2010 U.S. Supreme Court decision

Citizens United v. Federal Election Commission
- Supreme Court of the United States

Argued March 1, 2009 Reargued September 9, 2009 Decided January 21, 2010
- Full case name: Citizens United, Appellant v. Federal Election Commission
- Docket no.: 08-205
- Citations: 558 U.S. 310 (more) 130 S. Ct. 876; 175 L. Ed. 2d 753; 2010 U.S. LEXIS 766
- Argument: Oral argument
- Decision: Opinion

Case history
- Prior: Motion for preliminary injunction denied, 530 F. Supp. 2d 274 (D.D.C. 2008); probable jurisdiction noted, 555 U.S. 1028 (2008).

Holding
- The provisions of the Bipartisan Campaign Reform Act of 2002 restricting unions, corporations, and profitable organizations from independent political spending and prohibiting the broadcasting of political media funded by them within sixty days of general elections or thirty days of primary elections violate the freedom of speech that is protected by the First Amendment to the Constitution of the United States.

Court membership
- Chief Justice John Roberts Associate Justices John P. Stevens · Antonin Scalia; Anthony Kennedy · Clarence Thomas; Ruth Bader Ginsburg · Stephen Breyer; Samuel Alito · Sonia Sotomayor

Case opinions
- Majority: Kennedy, joined by Roberts, Scalia, Alito; Thomas (all but Part IV); Stevens, Ginsburg, Breyer, Sotomayor (Part IV)
- Concurrence: Roberts, joined by Alito
- Concurrence: Scalia, joined by Alito; Thomas (in part)
- Concur/dissent: Stevens, joined by Ginsburg, Breyer, Sotomayor
- Concur/dissent: Thomas

Laws applied
- U.S. Const. amend. I, Bipartisan Campaign Reform Act of 2002
- This case overturned a previous ruling or rulings
- Austin v. Michigan Chamber of Commerce (1990); McConnell v. FEC (2003) (in part)

Citizens United v. Federal Election Commission, 558 U.S. 310 (2010), is a landmark decision of the Supreme Court of the United States ruling that certain campaign finance restrictions are inconsistent with the Free Speech Clause of the First Amendment. By a 5-4 vote, the court struck down Section 203 of the Bipartisan Campaign Reform Act (BCRA), which prohibited "electioneering communications" paid for by corporations, labor unions, and other organizations in the months just before elections. A larger majority of the court upheld other parts of the BCRA, such as its disclosure provisions.

Justice Anthony Kennedy wrote the majority opinion, holding that the BCRA's prohibition of all independent expenditures by corporations and unions violated the First Amendment and freedom of association. The ruling bars restrictions on corporations', unions', and nonprofit organizations' independent expenditures, allowing groups to independently support political candidates with financial resources. In his dissent, Justice John Paul Stevens wrote that the ruling represented "a rejection of the common sense of the American people."

The Supreme Court's ruling in favor of Citizens United sparked significant controversy, with some viewing it as a defense of American principles of free speech and a safeguard against government overreach, and others criticizing it for reaffirming the longstanding principle of corporate personhood, and for allowing large corporations to wield disproportionate political power by allowing them to spend unlimited amounts of money to support their chosen political candidates, provided the corporations were technically independent of the campaigns.

Reactions to the decision were sharply divided. Typical were those of Senator Mitch McConnell, who called the decision "an important step in the direction of restoring the First Amendment rights", and of President Barack Obama, who said the decision "gives the special interests and their lobbyists even more power in Washington".

== Background ==
The Bipartisan Campaign Reform Act of 2002, commonly known as the McCain–Feingold Act or "BCRA", prohibited "electioneering communications" paid for by incorporated entities. These were defined as broadcast advertisements mentioning a candidate by name within 30 days of a primary election or 60 days of a general election, and reaching at least 40,000 people in the relevant electorate. During the 2004 presidential campaign, Citizens United, a conservative, nonprofit advocacy organization, filed a complaint with the Federal Election Commission (FEC) charging that advertisements for Michael Moore's film Fahrenheit 9/11, a docudrama critical of the Bush administration's response to the terrorist attacks on September 11, 2001, constituted "electioneering communications" and thus could not be aired 30 days before a primary election or 60 days before a general election. The FEC dismissed the complaint after finding no evidence that advertisements featuring a candidate within the proscribed time limits had actually been made. Citizens United later produced a documentary, Celsius 41.11, that criticized both Fahrenheit 9/11 and 2004 Democratic presidential nominee John Kerry. The FEC, however, held that showing Celsius 41.11 or advertisements for it during the 60 days before the election would violate the Federal Election Campaign Act, because Citizens United was not a bona fide commercial filmmaker.

In the wake of these decisions, Citizens United sought to establish itself as a bona fide commercial filmmaker before the 2008 elections, producing several documentary films. During the 2008 political primary season, it sought to run three television advertisements to promote its political documentary Hillary: The Movie, a film critical of Hillary Clinton, and to air the movie on DirecTV. Based on the FEC's 2004 decision, Citizens United feared that the FEC would hold that its ads and payments to DirecTV violated BCRA—specifically, Section 203, which defined an "electioneering communication" as a broadcast, cable, or satellite communication that mentions a candidate within 60 days of a general election or 30 days of a primary, and prohibited such expenditures by corporations and labor unions. Citizens United filed for declaratory and injunctive relief in federal court.

== District Court proceedings ==
In December 2007, Citizens United filed a complaint in U.S. District Court for the District of Columbia challenging the constitutionality of several statutory provisions governing "electioneering communications". It asked the court to declare that the prohibition on corporate and union funding were both facially unconstitutional and unconstitutional as applied to Hillary: The Movie and 30-second advertisements for it, and to enjoin the Federal Election Commission from enforcing its regulations. Citizens United also argued that the commission's disclosure and disclaimer requirements were unconstitutional as applied to the movie pursuant to the Supreme Court decision Federal Election Commission v. Wisconsin Right to Life, Inc. and sought to enjoin those requirements.

In accordance with Section 403 of the BCRA, a three-judge panel convened to hear the case. On January 15, 2008, the court denied Citizens United's motion for a preliminary injunction, finding that Citizens United was unlikely to succeed on the merits because the movie had no reasonable interpretation other than as an appeal to vote against Hillary Clinton. It held that the film constituted express advocacy of the election or defeat of a candidate and was not entitled to exemption from the ban on corporate funding of electioneering communications. The court upheld the relevant disclosure provisions on the basis of the Supreme Court decision McConnell v. FEC (2003), which found BCRA's disclosure requirements constitutional. It distinguished the Wisconsin Right to Life precedent as only addressing speech not considered express advocacy of the election or defeat of a candidate.

On July 18, 2008, the District Court ruled that Section 203 of the BCRA prohibited Citizens United from paying to have the film shown on television within 30 days of the 2008 Democratic primaries. But it also ruled that Citizens United could broadcast advertisements for the film, as they fell in the "safe harbor of the FEC's prohibition regulations".

In accordance with the special rules in BCRA, Citizens United appealed the District Court decision directly to the U.S. Supreme Court.

== Arguments before the Supreme Court ==
Arguments before the Supreme Court began on March 24, 2009. During the original oral argument, Deputy Solicitor General Malcolm L. Stewart (representing the FEC) argued that under Austin v. Michigan Chamber of Commerce in 1990, the government may ban books if those books contain content expressly advocating the election or defeat of a candidate and were published or distributed by a corporation or labor union. Stewart further argued that under Austin the government may ban the digital distribution of political books on the Amazon Kindle or prevent a union from hiring an author to write a political book.

Justice Kennedy later said, "all of us are concerned with money in politics". But he said he was shocked that "the government of the United States ... argued before the Supreme Court ... that if there was an upcoming political campaign ... and a book was being published ... and it was critical of a candidate, that [the government] could stop publication".

According to a 2012 article in The New Yorker by Jeffrey Toobin, the court planned to rule on the narrow question that had originally been presented: May Citizens United show the film? At the conference among the justices after oral argument, the vote was 5–4 in favor of allowing Citizens United to do so. The justices voted the same as they had in Federal Election Commission v. Wisconsin Right to Life, Inc.

Chief Justice John Roberts wrote the initial opinion of the court, holding that BCRA allowed the film to be shown. A draft concurring opinion by Justice Kennedy argued that the court should have gone much further. The other justices in the majority agreed with Kennedy's reasoning, and convinced Roberts to reassign the opinion and allow Kennedy's concurrence to become the majority opinion. The senior justice in the minority, John Paul Stevens, assigned the dissenting opinion to David Souter. Souter completed the task shortly before retiring from the court. According to Toobin, Souter's dissent went beyond critiquing the majority to air "some of the Court's dirty laundry", accusing Roberts of having manipulated court procedures to reach his desired result—an expansive decision that changed decades of election law and ruled on issues neither party to the litigation had presented. According to Toobin, Roberts agreed to withdraw the opinion and schedule the case for re-argument. But when he did, the questions presented to the parties were more expansive, touching on the issues Kennedy's opinion had raised.

The court issued an order directing the parties to reargue the case on September 9, 2009, with a discussion of whether it might be necessary to overrule Austin and/or McConnell v. FEC to decide the case. The reargument was one of the first attended by Justice Sonia Sotomayor, who had replaced Souter in the interim. It was also the first case argued by then-Solicitor General and future Supreme Court Justice Elena Kagan. Former Solicitor General Ted Olson and First Amendment lawyer Floyd Abrams argued for Citizens United, and another former solicitor general, Seth Waxman, defended the statute on behalf of various supporters. Legal scholar Erwin Chemerinsky called it "one of the most important First Amendment cases in years".

== Opinion of the court ==
On January 21, 2010, the court issued a 5–4 decision in favor of Citizens United that struck down the BCRA restrictions on independent political expenditures by corporations as violations of the First Amendment, reversing the District Court opinion.

=== Majority opinion ===
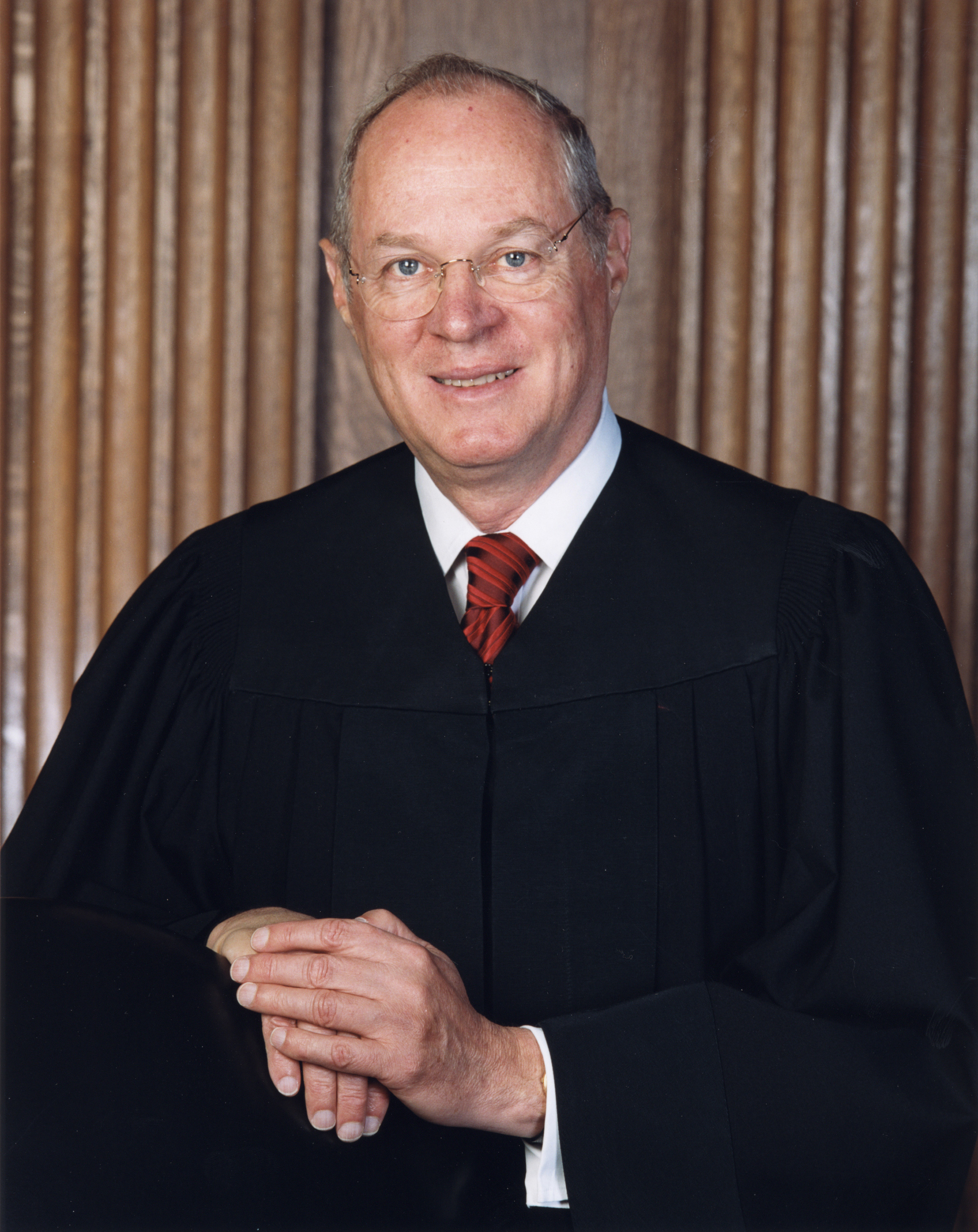
Anthony Kennedy delivered a majority opinion of the Court.

The majority opinion was by the moderate Justice Anthony Kennedy, who chose to align with the more conservative justices. The court held that BCRA Section 203's prohibition of all independent political expenditures by corporations and unions violated the First Amendment's protection of free speech. Kennedy wrote, "If the First Amendment has any force, it prohibits Congress from fining or jailing citizens, or associations of citizens, for simply engaging in political speech." He also wrote that because the First Amendment does not distinguish between media and other corporations, the BCRA restrictions improperly allowed Congress to suppress political speech in newspapers, books, television, and blogs. But, Kennedy wrote, "There is no such thing as too much speech."

The court overturned the 1990 precedent Austin v. Michigan Chamber of Commerce, which held that a state law that prohibited corporations from using money to support or oppose candidates in elections did not violate the Constitution. The majority criticized Austin's reasoning that the "distorting effect" of large corporate expenditures constituted a risk of corruption or the appearance of corruption. Rather, the majority argued, the government has no place in determining whether large expenditures distort an audience's perceptions, and the type of "corruption" that might justify government controls on spending for speech must relate to some form of "quid pro quo" transaction in which politicians favor corporations from which they receive donations. The court also overruled the part of the 2003 precedent McConnell v. FEC that upheld the BCRA restriction of corporate spending on electioneering communications.

The majority also held that the First Amendment's free press clause protects associations of individuals in addition to individual speakers, and further that the First Amendment does not allow prohibitions of speech based on the speaker's identity. Corporations, as associations of individuals, therefore have free speech rights under the First Amendment. Because spending money is essential to disseminating speech, as established in the 1976 precedent Buckley v. Valeo, limiting a corporation's ability to spend money is unconstitutional because it limits the corporation's members' ability to associate effectively and speak on political issues. The court's opinion relied heavily on Buckley and First National Bank of Boston v. Bellotti, in which it struck down a broad prohibition of independent expenditures by corporations in ballot initiatives and referendums. The majority argued that the First Amendment purposely keeps the government from "rationing" speech and interfering in the marketplace of ideas, and it is not up to legislatures or courts to create a sense of "fairness" by restricting speech.

On the other hand, the court found that BCRA Sections 201 and 311, which require disclosure of information about the funders of such speech, were valid as applied to the movie advertisements and to the movie itself. The majority ruled for the disclosure of the sources of campaign contributions, writing:

...prompt disclosure of expenditures can provide shareholders and citizens with the information needed to hold corporations and elected officials accountable for their positions and supporters. Shareholders can determine whether their corporation's political speech advances the corporation's interest in making profits, and citizens can see whether elected officials are "in the pocket" of so-called moneyed interests ... This transparency enables the electorate to make informed decisions and give proper weight to different speakers and messages.

=== Concurring opinions ===
Chief Justice Roberts wrote a separate concurring opinion "to address the important principles of judicial restraint and stare decisis implicated in this case". Roberts explained why the Supreme Court must sometimes overrule prior decisions. Had prior courts never gone against precedent, for example, "segregation would be legal, minimum wage laws would be unconstitutional, and the Government could wiretap ordinary criminal suspects without first obtaining warrants". Roberts's concurrence recited a plethora of case law in which the court had ruled against precedent. Ultimately, Roberts argued that "stare decisis... counsels deference to past mistakes, but provides no justification for making new ones". Roberts also briefly explained his reasoning for joining the majority. He explained:

"The [government's] ... theory, if accepted, would empower the Government to prohibit newspapers from running editorials or opinion pieces supporting or opposing candidates for office, so long as the newspapers were owned by corporations—as the major ones are. First Amendment rights could be confined to individuals, subverting the vibrant public discourse that is at the foundation of our democracy".

Justice Antonin Scalia also wrote a concurring opinion that addressed the dissent by Justice John Paul Stevens, specifically with regard to the original understanding of the First Amendment. Scalia wrote that Stevens's dissent was "in splendid isolation from the text of the First Amendment... It never shows why 'the freedom of speech' that was the right of Englishmen did not include the freedom to speak in association with other individuals, including association in the corporate form." He further considered the dissent's exploration of the Framers' views about the "role of corporations in society" to be misleading, and even if valid, irrelevant to the text of the Constitution. Scalia argued that the First Amendment was written in "terms of speech, not speakers" and that "Its text offers no foothold for excluding any category of speaker." This interpretation supported the majority's contention that the Constitution does not allow the courts to separate corporations into media and non-media categories.

Justice Clarence Thomas, another member of the majority, also wrote a separate concurring opinion in which he disagreed with upholding the disclosure provisions of BCRA Sections 201 and 311. To protect the anonymity of contributors to organizations exercising free speech, Thomas would have struck down those reporting requirements, rather than allowing them to be challenged only on a case-by-case basis. Thomas's primary argument was that anonymous free speech is protected by the First Amendment and that making contributor lists public makes the contributors vulnerable to retaliation. Thomas also expressed concern that such retaliation could extend to retaliation by elected officials.

=== Dissenting opinion ===
A dissenting opinion by Justice John Paul Stevens was joined by Justices Ruth Bader Ginsburg, Stephen Breyer, and Sonia Sotomayor. To emphasize his unhappiness with the majority, Stevens read part of his 90-page dissent from the bench. Stevens concurred in the court's decision to sustain BCRA's disclosure provisions but dissented from the principal holding. He said the majority ruling "threatens to undermine the integrity of elected institutions across the Nation. The path it has taken to reach its outcome will, I fear, do damage to this institution." He added: "A democracy cannot function effectively when its constituent members believe laws are being bought and sold." Stevens also said the court addressed a question not raised by the litigants when it found BCRA Section 203 to be facially unconstitutional, and that the majority "changed the case to give themselves an opportunity to change the law".

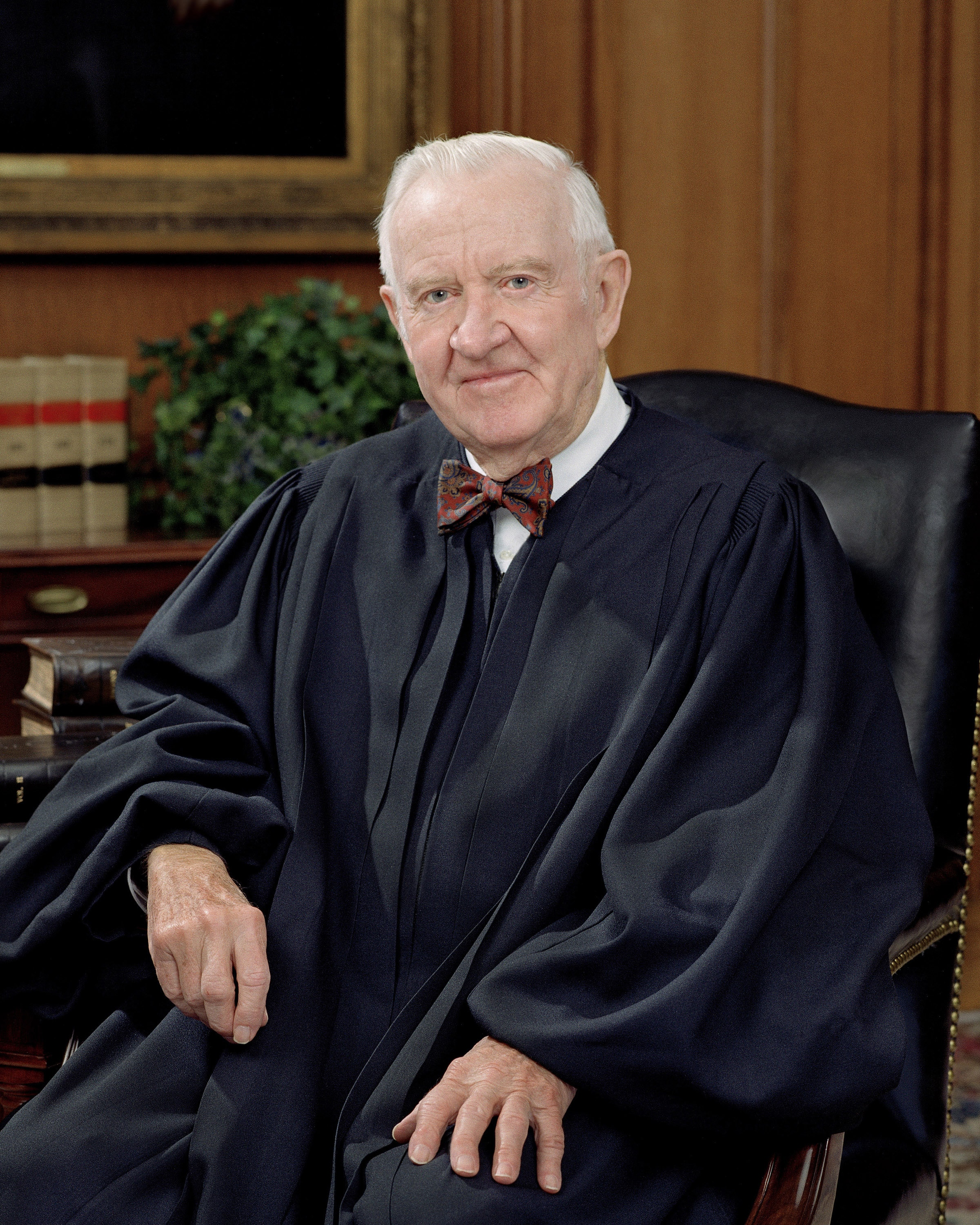
John Paul Stevens delivered a dissenting opinion of the Court.

Stevens argued that the court had long recognized that to deny Congress the power to safeguard against "the improper use of money to influence the result [of an election] is to deny to the nation in a vital particular the power of self protection". After recognizing that in Buckley v. Valeo the court had struck down portions of a broad prohibition of independent expenditures from any sources, Stevens argued that nevertheless Buckley recognized the legitimacy of "prophylactic" measures for limiting campaign spending and found the prevention of corruption to be a reasonable goal for legislation. Consequently, Stevens argued that Buckley left the door open for carefully tailored future regulation. Stevens further argued that the majority opinion contradicted the reasoning of other campaign finance precedents including Austin v. Michigan Chamber of Commerce and McConnell v. FEC.

On the matter of undue corporate influence on elections and spending on behalf of chosen candidates, Stevens cited First National Bank of Boston v. Bellotti and argued that the high court had "never suggested that such quid pro quo debts must take the form of outright vote buying or bribes". Again citing McConnell v. FEC, he argued that independent expenditures were sometimes a factor in gaining political access and concluded that large independent expenditures generate more influence than direct campaign contributions. Furthermore, Stevens argued that corporations could threaten politicians with negative advertising to gain unprecedented leverage, citing Caperton v. A.T. Massey Coal Co.

Hence, Stevens argued that the majority placed too little emphasis on the need to prevent the appearance of corruption in elections. Earlier cases, including Buckley, recognized the importance of public confidence in democracy. Stevens cited recent data indicating that 80% of the public viewed corporate independent expenditures as a method to gain unfair legislative influence. With corporations able to spend far more to influence elections than any ordinary citizen, Stevens was concerned that the majority opinion would cause the citizenry to "lose faith in our democracy".

Legal entities like corporations, Stevens wrote, are not "We the People" for whom our Constitution was established. Therefore, he argued, they should not be given speech protections under the First Amendment, which protects individual self-expression and self-realization. Corporate spending is the "furthest from the core of political expression" protected by the Constitution, he argued, citing Federal Election Commission v. Beaumont. According to Stevens, corporate spending on political advertising should be regulated as a business transaction, and evaluated on whether it conforms to the wishes of shareholders.

== Subsequent judicial developments ==
The Citizens United ruling represented a turning point on campaign finance, allowing unlimited election spending by corporations and labor unions, and setting the stage for Speechnow.org v. FEC (2010), which authorized the creation of super PACs, and McCutcheon v. FEC (2014), which struck down other campaign finance restrictions. The ruling also influenced the outcome of Arizona Free Enterprise Club's Freedom Club PAC v. Bennett (2011), in which the Supreme Court outlawed public funding by states for candidates who are unable to compete with the corporate donations gained by their opponents. An early study by a political scientist concluded that Citizens United works in favor of Republican candidates.

== Public reactions ==
Citizens United was highly controversial and remains a subject of widespread public discussion.

=== Support ===
Citizens United, upon its victory, said "Today's U.S. Supreme Court decision allowing Citizens United to air its documentary films and advertisements is a tremendous victory, not only for Citizens United but for every American who desires to participate in the political process." Republican politicians and advisors universally praised the Supreme Court's decision. According to Senate Minority Leader Mitch McConnell, "For too long, some in this country have been deprived of full participation in the political process. With today's monumental decision, the Supreme Court took an important step in the direction of restoring the First Amendment rights of these groups by ruling that the Constitution protects their right to express themselves about political candidates and issues up until Election Day. By previously denying this right, the government was picking winners and losers. Our democracy depends upon free speech, not just for some but for all."

Republican campaign consultant Ed Rollins opined that the decision adds transparency to the election process and will make it more competitive. Campaign finance attorney Cleta Mitchell, who had filed an amicus curiae brief on behalf of two advocacy organizations supporting Citizens United, wrote that "The Supreme Court has correctly eliminated a constitutionally flawed system that allowed media corporations... to freely disseminate their opinions about candidates using corporate treasury funds, while denying that constitutional privilege to Susie's Flower Shop Inc. ... The real victims of the corporate expenditure ban have been nonprofit advocacy organizations across the political spectrum."

Hans A. von Spakovsky—of The Heritage Foundation and former member of the Federal Election Commission—said, "The Supreme Court has restored a part of the First Amendment that had been unfortunately stolen by Congress and a previously wrongly-decided ruling of the court." John Samples and Ilya Shapiro of the Cato Institute disagreed with the idea "that corporations had so much money that their spending would create vast inequalities in speech that would undermine democracy".

Law professor Bradley A. Smith—former chairman of the FEC and founder of the Institute for Free Speech—wrote that the opponents of political free speech are "incumbent politicians" who "are keen to maintain a chokehold on such speech". Empowering "small and midsize corporations—and every incorporated mom-and-pop falafel joint, local firefighters' union, and environmental group—to make its voice heard" frightens them. Campaign finance expert Jan Baran, a member of the Commission on Federal Ethics Law Reform, wrote that "The history of campaign finance reform is the history of incumbent politicians seeking to muzzle speakers, any speakers, particularly those who might publicly criticize them and their legislation. It is a lot easier to legislate against unions, gun owners, 'fat cat' bankers, health insurance companies and any other industry or 'special interest' group when they can't talk back."

The editorial board of the San Antonio Express-News praised the ruling for overturning the BCRA exception for media corporations from the ban on corporate electioneering, writing that it "makes no sense" that the paper could make endorsements up until the day of the election but advocacy groups could not. "While the influence of money on the political process is troubling and sometimes corrupting, abridging political speech is the wrong way to counterbalance that influence."

=== Opposition ===
President Barack Obama said the decision "gives the special interests and their lobbyists even more power in Washington—while undermining the influence of average Americans who make small contributions to support their preferred candidates". Obama later said "this ruling strikes at our democracy itself" and "I can't think of anything more devastating to the public interest". Just days after the ruling, he condemned it in his 2010 State of the Union Address, saying: "Last week, the Supreme Court reversed a century of law to open the floodgates for special interests—including foreign corporations—to spend without limit in our elections. Well, I don't think American elections should be bankrolled by America's most powerful interests, or worse, by foreign entities." On television, the camera shifted to a shot of the Supreme Court Justices in the front row directly in front of Obama while he was saying this, and Justice Samuel Alito mouthed the words "Not true".

Democratic Senator Russ Feingold, a lead sponsor of the BCRA, said: "This decision was a terrible mistake. Presented with a relatively narrow legal issue, the Supreme Court chose to roll back laws that have limited the role of corporate money in federal elections since Teddy Roosevelt was president." Representative Alan Grayson said it was "the worst Supreme Court decision since the Dred Scott case, and that the court had opened the door to political bribery and corruption in elections to come. Senator John McCain, a co-crafter of the BCRA, said "there's going to be, over time, a backlash... when you see the amounts of union and corporate money that's going to go into political campaigns". McCain was "disappointed by the decision of the Supreme Court and the lifting of the limits on corporate and union contributions" but not surprised by the decision, saying, "It was clear that Justice Roberts, Alito and Scalia, by their very skeptical and even sarcastic comments, were very much opposed to BCRA."

Consumer activist Ralph Nader condemned the ruling, saying, "With this decision, corporations can now directly pour vast amounts of corporate money, through independent expenditures, into the electoral swamp already flooded with corporate campaign PAC contribution dollars." When discussing the ruling and related developments, former President Jimmy Carter called the United States "an oligarchy with unlimited political bribery" in an interview with Thom Hartmann. Retired Supreme Court Justice Sandra Day O'Connor, whose opinions had changed from dissenting in Austin v. Michigan State Chamber of Commerce to co-authoring (with Stevens) the majority opinion in McConnell v. FEC 12 years later, criticized the decision only obliquely, but warned, "In invalidating some of the existing checks on campaign spending, the majority in Citizens United has signaled that the problem of campaign contributions in judicial elections might get considerably worse and quite soon."

Constitutional law scholar Laurence H. Tribe wrote, "talking about a business corporation as merely another way that individuals might choose to organize their association with one another to pursue their common expressive aims is worse than unrealistic; it obscures the very real injustice and distortion entailed in the phenomenon of some people using other people's money to support candidates they have made no decision to support, or to oppose candidates they have made no decision to oppose." Cass Sunstein of Harvard University listed Citizens United as the "worst Supreme Court decision since 1960", saying that it is "undermining our system of democracy itself."

The New York Times wrote in an editorial, "The Supreme Court has handed lobbyists a new weapon. A lobbyist can now tell any elected official: if you vote wrong, my company, labor union or interest group will spend unlimited sums explicitly advertising against your re-election." Jonathan Alter called it the "most serious threat to American democracy in a generation". The Christian Science Monitor wrote that the court had declared "outright that corporate expenditures cannot corrupt elected officials, that influence over lawmakers is not corruption, and that appearance of influence will not undermine public faith in our democracy".

=== Polls ===
An ABC–Washington Post poll conducted shortly after the ruling showed that 80% of those surveyed opposed (and 65% strongly opposed) the ruling, with the pollsters interpreting the results as: "corporations and unions can spend as much money as they want to help political candidates win elections". Additionally, 72% supported "an effort by Congress to reinstate limits on corporate and union spending on election campaigns". The poll showed large majority support from Democrats, Republicans, and independents.

A Gallup Poll conducted in 2009, after oral arguments but publicized after the Supreme Court ruling, resulted in somewhat different conclusions. The poll found that 57% of those surveyed "agreed that money given to political candidates is a form of free speech" and 55% percent agreed that the "same rules should apply to individuals, corporations and unions". But in the same poll, 52% of respondents supported limits on campaign contributions over financial support of campaigns and 76% thought the government should be able to place limits on corporate or union donations.

Separate polls commissioned by various conservative organizations, including Citizens United and the Institute for Free Speech, using different wording, found support for the decision. In particular, a Center for Competitive Politics poll found that 51% of respondents believed that Citizens United should have a right to air ads promoting Hillary: The Movie. The poll also found that only 22% had heard of the Supreme Court ruling. Polling conducted by Ipsos in 2017 found that 48% of Americans oppose the decision and 30% support it, with the remainder having no opinion. The poll also found that 57% percent of Americans favored "limits on the amount of money super PACs can raise and spend".

== Legislative responses ==
=== Federal ===
In February 2010, shortly after the Supreme Court ruling, Senator Chuck Schumer and Representative Chris Van Hollen outlined legislation aimed at undoing the decision. In June the DISCLOSE Act passed in the House of Representatives but failed in the Senate. It would have required additional disclosure by corporations of their campaign expenditures. The law, if passed, would also have prohibited political spending by American companies with twenty percent or more foreign ownership, and by most government contractors. Also in 2010, Senator Dick Durbin proposed that laws on corporate governance be amended to assure that shareholders vote on political expenditures.

Multiple constitutional amendments have been introduced to overturn Citizens United. Representative Donna Edwards and Maryland State Senator Jamie Raskin circulated petitions to reverse the decision by constitutional amendment. Representative Leonard Boswell introduced legislation to amend the constitution. President Obama and Senator John Kerry also called for an amendment to overrule the decision. In 2011, Senator Bernie Sanders proposed the Saving American Democracy Amendment, which would reverse the ruling. In 2015, Sanders said, "the foundations of American democracy are being undermined" and called for sweeping campaign finance reform. He has repeated such calls in the years since.

=== States ===
The New York Times reported that 24 states with laws prohibiting or limiting independent expenditures by unions and corporations would have to change their campaign finance laws because of the ruling. After Citizens United, numerous state legislatures raised their limits on contributions to candidates and parties. Members of 16 state legislatures have called for a constitutional amendment to reverse the Supreme Court's decision. Most of these are non-binding resolutions, but three states—Vermont, California, and Illinois—called for an Article V Convention to draft and propose a federal constitutional amendment to overturn Citizens United. (Thirty-four states are needed to call an Article V convention.) California has since rescinded its call for a convention. In Minnesota, the state senate passed a similar resolution but it did not survive further discussions by the state assembly. On the local level, Washington, D.C., and 400 other municipalities passed resolutions requesting a federal constitutional amendment.

In 2026, Hawaii and Montana, along with some other states, began introducing legislation designed to undo the impact of Citizens United by recognizing that corporations are only virtual persons granted that privilege by the state and thus allowing states to restrict their rights, including campaign financing.

== Political impact ==
Critics predicted that Citizens United would "bring about a new era of corporate influence in politics", allowing companies to "buy elections" to promote their financial interests. Instead, large expenditures, usually through super PACs, have come from "a small group of billionaires", based largely on ideology. The New York Times asked seven academics to opine on how corporate money would reshape politics as a result of the court's decision. Three wrote that the effects would be minimal or positive: Christopher Cotton wrote that "There may be very little difference between seeing eight ads or seeing nine ads... And, voters recognize that richer candidates are not necessarily the better candidates, and in some cases, the benefit of running more ads is offset by the negative signal that spending a lot of money creates. Eugene Volokh wrote that the "most influential actors in most political campaigns" are media corporations that "overtly editorialize for and against candidates, and also influence elections by choosing what to cover and how to cover it". Holding that corporations like Exxon would fear alienating voters by supporting candidates, the decision really meant that voters would hear "more messages from more sources".

According to a 2020 report from OpenSecrets, between 2010 and 2020, the ten largest donors and their spouses spent a total of $1.2 billion on federal elections. In the 2018 elections, this group accounted for around 7% of all election-related giving, up from less than 1% a decade prior. Over the decade, election-related spending by non-partisan independent groups jumped to $4.5 billion, whereas from 1990 to 2010 the total spending under that category was just $750 million. Outside spending surpassed candidate spending in 126 races since the ruling compared to only 15 in the five election cycles prior. Groups that did not disclose their donors spent $963 million in the decade following the ruling, compared to $129 million in the decade prior. Non-partisan outside spending as a percentage of total election spending increased from 6% in 2008 to nearly 20% in 2018. During the 2016 election cycle, super PACs spent more than $1 billion, nearly twice that of every other category of contributors combined. In 2018, over 95% of super PAC money came from the top 1% of donors.

Citizens United has often been credited for the creation of super PACs—political action committees—that make no direct financial contributions to candidates or parties but instead spend money on advertising, and can in turn accept unlimited contributions from individuals, corporations, and unions. According to a 2021 study, the ruling weakened political parties while strengthening single-issue advocacy groups and super PACs funded by billionaires with pet issues. The ruling made it easier for self-promoting politicians to undermine political processes and democratic norms to promote themselves by soliciting funds from such committees.

Citizens United also allowed incorporated 501(c)(4) public advocacy groups (such as the National Rifle Association of America, the American Israel Public Affairs Committee, the Sierra Club, or Citizens United itself) to make expenditures in political races. Such groups may not, under the tax code, have a primary purpose of engaging in electoral advocacy but they can advertise on behalf of larger political issues. A number of partisan organizations such as Crossroads Grassroots Policy Strategies and 21st Century Colorado have since registered as tax-exempt 501(c)(4) groups and have engaged in substantial political spending. This has led to claims of large secret donations, and questions about whether such groups should be required to disclose their donors, which they were required to do before the Citizens United ruling.

While the long-term legacy of the ruling remains to be seen, studies by political scientists have concluded that Citizens United worked in favor of the electoral success of Republican candidates. One study by the University of Chicago, Columbia University, and the London School of Economics found "that Citizens United increased the GOP's average seat share in the state legislature[s] by five percentage points. That is a large effect—large enough that, were it applied to the past twelve Congresses, partisan control of the House would have switched eight times." A 2016 study in The Journal of Law and Economics found "that Citizens United is associated with an increase in Republicans' election probabilities in state house races of approximately 4 percentage points overall and 10 or more percentage points in several states. We link these estimates to on-the-ground evidence of significant spending by corporations through channels enabled by Citizens United."

== Election impact ==
Political donations from the growing number of billionaires and their immediate families has increased dramatically since 2004, with Republicans receiving a sharp increase in 2024 compared to Democrats.

Since the Citizens United decision, outside spending on campaigns has continuously increased. During the 2008 election cycle, the last election before the ruling, outside spending accounted for $574 million of all election spending. In 2012 it increased to $1.3 billion. By 2020, outside spending was $3.3 billion and $4.5 billion in 2024. Most of this money was spent by super PACs, whose creation is attributed by some to the ruling.

Citizens United, by loosening contribution rules, may have helped facilitate the increasing influence of wealthy individuals in U.S. elections. In the 2008 election, "the top 100 individual donors contributed an aggregate $80.9 million, accounting for 1.5% of the $5.3 billion spent on federal elections." This percentage continued to rise after the 2010 election, the first after the ruling, reaching a peak of 15.8% in 2020. During the 2024 election, it decreased to 14.8%. The largest donor in the 2024 election cycle was Elon Musk, contributing $277 million.

== See also ==
- 2010 term opinions of the Supreme Court of the United States
- End Citizens United
- Stamp Stampede
- Issue advocacy ads
- First National Bank of Boston v. Bellotti
- Shadow campaigns in the United States
