= Austin v. Michigan Chamber of Commerce =

- Supreme Court of the United States

Argued October 31, 1989 Decided March 27, 1990
- Full case name: Richard H. Austin, Michigan Secretary of State, et al. v. Michigan Chamber of Commerce
- Citations: 494 U.S. 652 (more) 110 S. Ct. 1391; 108 L. Ed. 2d 652; 1990 U.S. LEXIS 1665; 58 U.S.L.W. 4371

Case history
- Prior: Judgment for defendants, Michigan State Chamber of Commerce v. Austin, 643 F. Supp 397 (W.D. Mich. 1986); reversed, 856 F.2d 783 (6th Cir. 1988); rehearing denied, 865 F.2d 716 (6th Cir. 1988); probable jurisdiction noted, 490 U.S. 1045 (1989).
- Subsequent: Affirmed, 937 F.2d 608 (6th Cir. 1991).

Holding
- The Michigan Campaign Finance Act, which prohibited corporations from using treasury money to support or oppose candidates in elections, did not violate the First or the Fourteenth Amendment.

Court membership
- Chief Justice William Rehnquist Associate Justices William J. Brennan Jr. · Byron White; Thurgood Marshall · Harry Blackmun; John P. Stevens · Sandra Day O'Connor; Antonin Scalia · Anthony Kennedy

Case opinions
- Majority: Marshall, joined by Rehnquist, Brennan, White, Blackmun, Stevens
- Concurrence: Brennan
- Concurrence: Stevens
- Dissent: Scalia
- Dissent: Kennedy, joined by O'Connor, Scalia

Laws applied
- U.S. Const. amends. I, XIV
- Overruled by
- Citizens United v. FEC, 558 U.S. 310 (2010)

Austin v. Michigan Chamber of Commerce, 494 U.S. 652 (1990), was a decision of the Supreme Court of the United States regarding campaign finance regulations. Thurgood Marshall's majority opinion held that the Michigan Campaign Finance Act, which burdened political speech by prohibiting corporations from using treasury money to make independent expenditures to support or oppose candidates in elections, was appropriately justified by a compelling state interest so as to overcome a First Amendment challenge. The court also found no Fourteenth Amendment violation, stating that Congress could treat press corporations and nonpress corporations differently without violating the Equal Protection Clause. Upholding the restriction on corporate political speech, the court stated that "corporate wealth can unfairly influence elections". The Michigan law, however, continued to allow corporations to make such expenditures from a segregated fund.

== Background ==
The Michigan Campaign Finance Act banned corporations from spending treasury money on "independent expenditures to support or oppose candidates in elections for state offices." The act had a deliberate loophole—that if a corporation had an independent fund solely used for political purposes, the law did not apply to the money spent from that fund. The Michigan Chamber of Commerce sought to use its general funds to publish an advertisement in a local newspaper to support a candidate for the Michigan House of Representatives.

== Opinion of the Court ==
The appellants were represented before the court by Louis J. Caruso, while the respondent Michigan Chamber of Commerce was represented by Richard D. McLellan.

Thurgood Marshall's majority opinion held that the act did not violate the First or Fourteenth Amendments. The Court recognized a state's compelling interest in combating a "different type of corruption in the political arena: the corrosive and distorting effects of immense aggregations of wealth that are accumulated with the help of the corporate form and that have little or no correlation to the public's support for the corporation's political ideas."

Marshall concluded by noting the importance of the act:

Michigan identified as a serious danger the significant possibility that corporate political expenditures will undermine the integrity of the political process, and it has implemented a narrowly tailored solution to that problem. By requiring corporations to make all independent political expenditures through a separate fund made up of money solicited expressly for political purposes, the Michigan Campaign Finance Act reduces the threat that huge corporate treasuries amassed with the aid of favorable state laws will be used to influence unfairly the outcome of elections.

Marshall was joined in the majority by Chief Justice William Rehnquist and Justices William Brennan, Byron White, Harry Blackmun, and John Paul Stevens. Justice Anthony Kennedy wrote a dissenting opinion, joined by Justices Antonin Scalia and Sandra Day O'Connor.

== Subsequent developments ==
The decision was overruled by the 2010 Supreme Court case Citizens United v. FEC, ruling that the First Amendment right of free speech applied to corporations.

== See also ==
- United States corporate law
- List of United States Supreme Court cases, volume 494
- List of United States Supreme Court cases
- Lists of United States Supreme Court cases by volume
- List of United States Supreme Court cases by the Rehnquist Court
- Appearance of corruption
