= Appearance of corruption =

Legal principle related to campaign finance in the United States

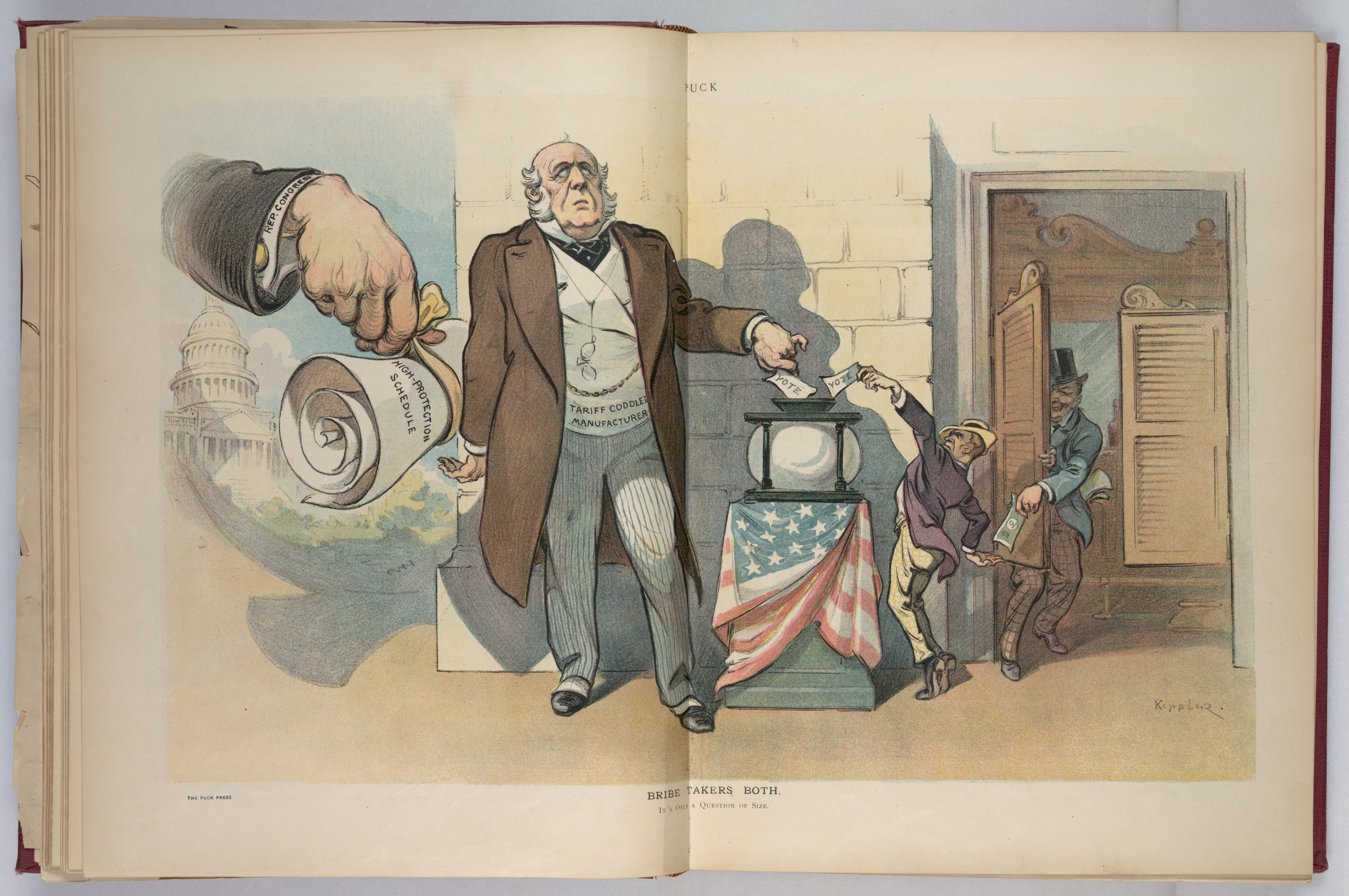
A cartoon depicts the behavior of taking bribes.

The appearance of corruption is a principle of law mentioned in, or relevant to, several U.S. Supreme Court decisions related to campaign finance in the United States.

== Examples of U.S. Supreme Court ==
- Buckley v. Valeo, 424 U.S. 1 (1976)
- Davis v. FEC, 554 U.S. 724 (2008)
- Citizens United v. FEC, 558 U.S. 310 (2010)
- First National Bank of Boston v. Bellotti, 435 U.S. 765 (1978)
- McConnell v. FEC, 540 U.S. 93 (2003)
- McCutcheon v. FEC, 572 U.S. 185 (2014)

== See also ==
- ISO 37001 Anti-bribery management systems
- Group of States Against Corruption
- International Anti-Corruption Academy
- United Nations Convention against Corruption
- OECD Anti-Bribery Convention
