= Federal Election Campaign Act =

U.S. federal law regulating political campaign spending and fundraising

Federal Election Campaign Act of 1971
- Long title: An Act to promote fair practices in the conduct of election campaigns for Federal political offices, and for other purposes.
- Acronyms (colloquial): FECA
- Enacted by: the 92nd United States Congress
- Effective: February 7, 1972

Citations
- Public law: Pub. L. 92–225
- Statutes at Large: 86 Stat. 3

Codification
- Acts amended: Communications Act of 1934

Legislative history
- Introduced in the Senate as S. 382 by Mike Mansfield (D–MT) on January 28, 1971; Committee consideration by Senate Finance and Senate Rules and Administration; Passed the Senate on August 5, 1971 (88–2); Passed the House on November 30, 1971 (373–23); Reported by the joint conference committee on December 14, 1971; agreed to by the Senate on December 14, 1971 (unanimous consent) and by the House on January 19, 1972 (334–20); Signed into law by President Richard Nixon on February 7, 1972

The Federal Election Campaign Act of 1971 (FECA, Pub. L. 92–225, 86 Stat. 3, enacted February 7, 1972, 52 U.S.C. § 30101 et seq.) is the primary United States federal law regulating political campaign fundraising and spending. The law originally focused on creating limits for campaign spending on communication media, adding additional penalties to the criminal code for election law violations, and imposing disclosure requirements for federal political campaigns. The Act was signed into law by President Richard Nixon on February 7, 1972.

WHEN I vetoed the bill to limit expenditures on political broadcasting in October of 1970, I pointed out that the goal of controlling campaign expenditures was a highly laudable one. The chief problem with the bill then before me was that it did not limit overall costs but applied only to radio and television. As I put it then, it plugged "only one hole in a sieve."

Since that time, the House and Senate have worked to design a better bill. I believe they have succeeded in that endeavor. S. 382, the Federal Election Campaign Act of 1971, limits the amount candidates for Federal elective offices may spend on advertising, not just on radio and television, but through all communications media. It limits contributions by candidates and their families to their own campaigns. It provides for full reporting of both the sources and the uses of campaign funds, both after elections and during campaigns. By giving the American public full access to the facts of political financing, this legislation will guard against campaign abuses and will work to build public confidence in the integrity of the electoral process.

The Federal Election Campaign Act of 1971 is a realistic and enforceable bill, an important step forward in an area which has been of great public concern. Because I share that concern, I am pleased to give my approval to this bill.

In 1974, the act was amended to create the Federal Election Commission (FEC) and to further regulate campaign spending. The act was amended again in 1976, in response to the provisions ruled unconstitutional by Buckley v. Valeo, including the structure of the FEC and the limits on campaign expenditures, and again in 1979 to allow parties to spend unlimited amounts of hard money on activities like increasing voter turnout and registration. In 1979, the FEC ruled that political parties could spend unregulated or "soft" money for non-federal administrative and party building activities. Later, this money was used for candidate-related issue ads, which led to a substantial increase in soft money contributions and expenditures in elections. This in turn led to passage of the Bipartisan Campaign Reform Act of 2002 ("BCRA"), effective on January 1, 2003, which banned soft money expenditure by parties. Some of the legal limits on giving of "hard money" were also changed by BCRA.

== Background ==
As early as 1905, Theodore Roosevelt argued in favor of campaign finance reform and called for a ban of corporate contributions for political purposes. In response, the United States Congress passed the Tillman Act of 1907, which banned the corporate contributions. Further regulation followed in the Federal Corrupt Practices Act enacted in 1910, and subsequent amendments in 1910 and 1925, the Hatch Act, the Smith–Connally Act of 1943, and the Taft–Hartley Act in 1947. These acts sought to regulate corporate and union spending in campaigns for federal office, and mandated public disclosure of campaign donors.

== Legislative history ==
In 1970, President Nixon vetoed the Political Broadcast Act of 1970, a bill that aimed to establish laws regulating campaign spending on television and radio. President Nixon claimed that the Political Broadcast Act did not sufficiently limit campaign expenditures, noting that it "plugged only one hole in a sieve." This bill was an attempt to regulate election spending, but despite having the necessary membership to override the veto, Senate Democrats did not pass the law without the President's signature. Subsequently, Senator Mike Mansfield introduced S. 382, later to be known as FECA, to the Senate on January 26, 1971, in the 92nd Congress.

The Act was first introduced to the Senate Subcommittee on Communications of the Committee on Commerce on March 2, 1971, by Senator John Pastore. After passing the Senate Committee on Commerce by a vote of 18–0, the Act passed the Senate floor on August 5, 1971, by a vote of 88–2.

In the House, the Act passed on November 30, 1971, by a vote of 372–23. Because the House version was not identical to the Senate version, a conference committee was called. On December 14, 1971, the Senate agreed to the conference report, and on January 19, 1972, the House agreed to the conference report, sending the bill to President Nixon.

== Original provisions ==
=== Campaign communications ===
The Act limited campaign expenditures for broadcast media, newspaper advertisement, and telephone calls to $0.10 per voter in the district they're running in when adjusted for inflation using the consumer price index. The Act also limited the amount campaigns could spend on broadcast media to 60% of their total campaign spending limitation. Additionally, the Act required broadcast and non-broadcast media to charge the lowest unit rate for advertisements for all candidates within the 45 days leading up to a primary election and the 60 days leading up to a general election. Despite several debates on the issue, the Act did not repeal Section 315 of the Communications Act of 1934, a requirement that media companies offer equal broadcast time to candidates for federal office.

=== Criminal code amendments ===
Promises of rewards or gifts were prohibited under FECA, meaning that a candidate for office could not offer employment or other benefits in exchange for donations or other forms of political aid. The Act also placed a cap on the amount a candidate could spend of their own money on their campaign at $50,000 for presidential and Vice Presidential candidates, $35,000 for Senate candidates, and $25,000 for candidates for the House of Representatives.

Violations of the policies outlined in the Act carried fines of up to $1,000 and up to one year of imprisonment, or both.

=== Disclosure requirements ===
The Act required candidates for federal office to disclose the expenditures they made and contributions they received if those amounts totaled more than $100. Candidates were also required to disclose the structure and membership of their political committees if they intended to receive and spend more than $1,000 during a calendar year. Political committees were required to keep track of the name, occupation, address, and amount that any person contributes if that amount exceeded $10. Additionally, the Act outlawed making contributions in the name of another person or knowingly accepting contributions that are being made in the name of another person.

Reports were to be sent to the Comptroller General of the Government Accountability Office for presidential elections, the Secretary of the Senate for Senatorial elections, and the Clerk of the House for House of Representatives elections. Candidates were also required to report finances to the Secretary of State's office in the state they are running for elected office in.

== 1974 amendments ==
Following the 1972 Presidential election, Congress amended the FECA in 1974 to set limits on contributions by individuals, political parties and PACs. The 1974 amendments also established an independent agency, the Federal Election Commission (FEC) to enforce the law, facilitate disclosure and administer the public funding program. The FEC commenced in 1975 and administered the first publicly funded presidential election in 1976.

In 1976, the Supreme Court in Buckley v. Valeo struck down several key provisions of the 1974 amendments, including limits on spending by candidate campaigns, limits on the ability of citizens to spend money independently of a campaign, and limits on the amount of money a candidate could donate to his or her own campaign. The case also substantially narrowed the category of independent political expenditures subject to mandatory donor disclosure.

== 1976 and 1979 amendments ==
Further amendments to the FECA were made in 1976 to conform the law with the ruling in Buckley v. Valeo. Major amendments were also made in 1979 to streamline the disclosure process and expand the role of political parties.

== 2002 amendments ==
In 2002, major revisions to the FECA were made by the Bipartisan Campaign Reform Act, more commonly referred to as "McCain–Feingold." However, major portions of McCain-Feingold were struck down by the Supreme Court on constitutional grounds in Federal Election Commission v. Wisconsin Right to Life, Inc. (2007), Davis v. Federal Election Commission (2008) and Citizens United v. Federal Election Commission (2010). The Citizens United ruling also struck down FECA's complete ban on corporate and union independent spending, originally passed as part of the Taft–Hartley Act in 1947.

== See also ==
- Campaign finance in the United States
- Buckley v. Valeo
- McConnell v. Federal Election Commission
- Attorney Michael Cohen conviction on Trump 2016 POTUS campaign finance charge
- Citizens United v. Federal Election Commission
- Bipartisan Campaign Reform Act of 2002, also known as the McCain–Feingold Act
