= Shadow campaigns in the United States =

Shadow campaigns (or dark money) refers to spending meant to influence political outcomes where the source of the money is not publicly disclosed or is difficult to trace. United States campaign finance law has been regulated by the Federal Election Commission since its creation in the wake of the Watergate Scandal in 1975, and in the years following Citizens United v. FEC, there has been a rise in outside special interest groups spending money on political campaigns in the United States. Dark money leaves voters uninformed about important political information and it can obscure potential conflicts of interest for judges and legislators alike.

== Dark money ==
Shadow campaigns run on dark money, or money that is spent by an undisclosed donor that is intended to influence a given constituencies voting patterns. Dark money is often spent by non-profit organizations and super-PACs.

== Types of outside interest groups ==
=== Political non-profit organizations ===
Initially, non-profit organizations were limited in their abilities to contribute to political activities in The United States. Slowly, these organizations have risen to prominence in terms of campaign fundraising and spending in American elections. In Buckley v. Valeo (1976), the Supreme Court of the United States determined that these outside groups could spend money independently on issue ads that do not contain any expressed advocacy for a candidate or party. Additionally, they could make independent expenditures so long as that expenditure was done with "hard money" that was regulated by and disclosed to the Federal Election Commission. There are several types of political non-profit organizations, including 501(c)(4)s (social welfare organizations), 501(c)(5)s (labor unions), and 501(c)(6)s (business and trade organizations). The rise of 501(c)(4) social welfare organizations forced the courts to change how they viewed non-profit organizations. In FEC v. Massachusetts Citizens for Life (1986), the Supreme Court recognized that non-profits serve different functions and should be treated differently. The Court ruled that the group (Massachusetts Citizens for Life) had violated the Federal Election Campaign Act by dispersing political propaganda using funds from its general treasury. But, the Court reasoned that, if social welfare groups have a predominantly political purpose and take the entirety of their donations from citizens, then the revenue generated reflects public opinion; so long as groups do not engage in any business-like activity, preventing them from spending money for political purposes this would be a first amendment violation.

As a result of FEC v. Massachusetts Citizens for Life, a new type of company, the Qualified Non-Profit Corporation (QNC), was born. This would be the standard until the Bipartisan Campaign Reform Act (2002). The BCRA had provisions that specifically targeted non-profit organizations, disallowing them from purchasing ads aimed at a specific constituency with the intent to persuade. This would soon be challenged in FEC v. Wisconsin Right to Life, Inc. (2007) where it was found that Congress could only regulate expressed advocacy. This set up the landmark case Citizens United v. FEC (2010). The Citizens United ruling essentially equated money spent with speech, treating these groups like individuals. The Supreme Court held that limiting money spent by an interest group is equivocal to limiting the voice of an individual. As a result, organizations that had a "primary purpose" unrelated to politics could endorse candidates, organize partisan activities, and purchase advertising, all with funds from their general treasury. As long as they followed the "primary purpose rule" they are not legally obligated to disclose their donors. Hence the term, dark money.

Citizens United v. Federal Election Commission

=== Super-PACs ===
A new type of committee has emerged in recent times known as a "Super" Political Action Committee. Super-PACs were created in the aftermath of Speechnow.org v. FEC. SpeechNow was an unincorporated, non-profit 527 political interest group. Their sole purpose was to pool funds to partake in independent expenditures expressly advocating in elections. The Supreme Court of the United States found that since the group was a citizen group with the sole goal of pursuing political activity, and further was not incorporated and therefore not barred from expenditures, they should not be limited in their contributions. The idea being that since their sole purpose was to engage in independent expenditures, there was no reason to believe there is a threat of corruption so long as their expenditures remain separate from the candidates, committees, and parties. Additionally, the rules of independent expenditures still apply, so they must fully disclose what they spend their money on as well as who their donors are. The United States government had no intentions of limiting donations to citizen movements, just campaigns subject to corruption. Super-PACs, as they would come to be called, began to pop up everywhere. Free to raise and spend unlimited amounts of money, super-PACs dominate election spending in the United States. These independent expenditure-only committees, raise money from corporations, unions, and individuals with free rein to express advocacy as they choose. Unlike a regular Political Action Committee (PAC), these groups cannot donate to campaigns. Even talking to these campaigns is considered illegal through the United States laws on coordination. Super-PACs typically operate legally, however, there are instances where they can manipulate the system and act as a dark money organization. Super-PACs must disclose their donors, though, they can accept unlimited donations from non-profit organizations, such as 501(c) organizations and "shell" corporations who do not have to disclose their donors. These loopholes makes it easier to funnel money from group to group, expanding the amount of dark money in these shadow campaigns.

== Coordination laws ==
The FEC Seal

A "Super-PAC" can spend unlimited amounts with expressed advocacy to a campaign, as long as its expenditures are independent of any campaign: there can be no coordination between with candidates, committees, or the parties. All communications, monetary contributions or payments must be made outside of the candidate, committees, or parties. Essentially, communications made at the request or suggestion of the candidate, committee, or party are illegal. Second, the content of the expenditure directly makes political reference to a party or candidate with the intent to influence an election within ninety days of that election. Meaning, it is illegal if the campaign has any involvement in the material content of the communication. Third, the conduct of those running the advertisement should not suggest any coordination with a candidate, party, or committee. Thus, even the campaign having substantial conversations with the spender prior to the communication is illegal. Lastly, the campaign and the spender cannot employ a common vendor, nor previous employees within 120 days. This ensures that the campaign doesn't intentionally funnel information through a common vendor from party to party, nor can a campaign purposely let an employee go with the intent of coordinating on advertisements with an outside group.

== See also ==
Laws

- Tillman Act (1907)
- Pendleton Act (1883)
- Federal Corrupt Practices Act (1910, 1925)
- Hatch Act(1939)
- Taft-Hartley Act (1947)
- Federal Election Campaign Act (1971, 1974)
- Bipartisan Campaign Reform Act(2002)

Cases

- Newberry v. United States (1921)
- SUN-PAC: Solicitation of Contributions (1972)
- Buckley v. Valeo (1976)
- FEC v. Massachusetts Citizens for Life (1986)
- Austin v. Michigan Chamber of Commerce (1990)
- McConnell v. FEC (2003)
- FEC v. Wisconsin Right to Life, Inc. (2007)
- Davis v. FEC (2008)
- Citizens United v. FEC (2010)
