= Joint Victory Campaign 2004 =

- Formation: 2003
- Dissolved: 2004
- Type: 527 organization
- Purpose: Political fundraising
- Headquarters: Washington, D.C., United States
- Key people: Steve Rosenthal; Harold Ickes
- Affiliations: America Coming Together; The Media Fund
- Revenue: $71.8 million (2004)
- Expenses: $72.6 million (2004)

The Joint Victory Campaign 2004 (JVC 2004) was a prominent political fundraising entity during the 2004 U.S. presidential election, operating as a 527 organization—a tax-exempt group engaged in political activities under Section 527 of the Internal Revenue Code. Established collaboratively by America Coming Together (ACT) and the Media Fund, JVC 2004 functioned as a joint fundraising committee, with its proceeds divided between these two organizations to support their respective political initiatives.

== Formation ==
Formed in late 2003, JVC 2004 was led by Steve Rosenthal and Harold Ickes, both prominent figures in Democratic political circles. The campaign served as the chief fundraising entity for the so-called Shadow Party—a network of nonprofit activist groups organized to promote Democratic Party agendas and candidates during the 2004 election cycle.

== Financial activities ==
In the 2004 election cycle, JVC 2004 emerged as one of the most significant 527 groups in terms of financial activity. It reported total receipts of approximately $71.8 million (equivalent to $119,527,519 in 2024) and expenditures around $72.6 million (equivalent to $120,859,302 in 2024), ranking second among federally focused 527 organizations for that period.

The campaign attracted substantial contributions from several high-profile donors, including financier George Soros, insurance executive Peter B. Lewis, film producer Steve Bing, and philanthropist Linda Pritzker. These individuals were part of a broader group of affluent donors who collectively contributed millions to JVC 2004.

== Allocation of funds ==
The funds raised by JVC 2004 were allocated to its parent organizations, ACT and The Media Fund, each playing distinct roles in the campaign landscape. ACT focused on voter mobilization and registration efforts, aiming to increase electoral participation among demographics likely to support Democratic candidates. The Media Fund concentrated on producing and disseminating political advertisements critical of Republican candidates, particularly President George W. Bush.

== Impact and legacy ==
JVC 2004 and similar 527 organizations during the 2004 election cycle operated in a regulatory environment shaped by the Bipartisan Campaign Reform Act of 2002, which imposed new restrictions on traditional party fundraising mechanisms. Consequently, 527 organizations became instrumental in channeling substantial financial resources into political campaigns, operating in a space that allowed for significant contributions outside the limits applied to direct candidate support.
