= The Restoring Prosperity Fund =

U.S. political organization

The Restoring Prosperity Fund is a political organization in the United States, formerly known as the Americans for Rick Perry SuperPAC, founded in 2010. The group is a 527 organization, which grants it tax-exempt status.

== Leadership ==
- Bob Schuman, Executive Director
- Jeff LaCourse, Political Director
- Brad Henson, Director of Operations

== The American Education Project ==
In December 2011 the group established a spin-off 501(c) group called The American Education Project (AEP). This is a Super PAC political organization that lobbies for free enterprise, states' rights, maintaining and controlling a Majority in the United States House of Representatives and the United States Senate, and working with like-minded organizations and demographics.

The American Education Project works in conjunction with The Restoring Prosperity Fund. As a 501(c)(4) nonprofit, AEP's primary purpose is the advancement of social welfare including public policy advocacy, although it is permitted to engage in political spending as well. AEP is required to report what it spends, but it is not required to publicly disclose any donor information.
