= BISC =

BISC may refer to:

- Ballot Initiative Strategy Center
- British International School in Cairo
- BISC (database)
