= America Votes =

American political organization

- Formation: 2004
- Type: 501(c)(4) organization
- Purpose: Supporting Democratic candidates and progressive policies
- Headquarters: Washington, D.C.
- President: Greg Speed
- Website: https://americavotes.org/

America Votes is a 501(c)(4) organization that aims "to coordinate and promote progressive issues." America Votes leads national and state-based coalitions to advance progressive policies and increase voter turnout for Democratic Party candidates.

America Votes was created prior to the 2004 United States presidential election by Ellen Malcolm, the founder of EMILY's List; former Sierra Club executive director Carl Pope; Harold Ickes; Steve Rosenthal; and Andy Stern, the former president of Service Employees International Union (SEIU). Cecile Richards was the founding president. Greg Speed serves as president of the organization.

== Activities ==
America Votes coordinates GOTV and advocacy campaigns in the United States, "helping liberal advocacy groups work together to avoid overlapping efforts". According to POLITICO, America Votes has "expanded dramatically" since 2020. America Votes is also involved in advocacy efforts to expand access to voting. For example, the organization recently opposed efforts to restrict out of state students from voting in New Hampshire.

== Funding ==
America Votes does not disclose its donors. The group raised $12.7 million in 2013, and projects revenue of $8.5 million in 2014. According to the Center for Public Integrity, "Between 40 percent and 50 percent of that sum is projected to come from wealthy donors connected to the Democracy Alliance, a secretive nonprofit whose funders include the likes of billionaire investor George Soros and author, horticulturalist and philanthropist Amy Goldman."

In 2018, the Sixteen Thirty Fund gave America Votes $27 million. The $27 million grant was nearly twice the amount America Votes had previously ever raised in a single year.

== Donors ==
The following groups have donated to America Votes:

- National Education Association (over $1 million between October 2012 and September 2013)
- Service Employees International Union ($443,000)
- American Federation of State, County and Municipal Employees ($333,000)
- United Food and Commercial Workers ($28,000)
- Mayors Against Illegal Guns
- League of Conservation Voters
- Ballot Initiative Strategy Center
- Tides Advocacy Fund ($1.8 million in 2012 election cycle)
- Fred Eychaner
- Jon Stryker

== Member organizations ==
The following groups are listed on the America Votes website as "national partners":

- AFL–CIO
- American Federation of State, County and Municipal Employees (AFSCME)
- American Association for Justice
- American Federation of Teachers
- Ballot Initiative Strategy Center
- Bull Moose Sportsmen Alliance
- Center for Community Change
- Clean Water Action
- EMILY's List
- Environment America
- Every Voice
- Fair Elections Legal Network
- Fair Share
- Human Rights Campaign
- International Association of Fire Fighters
- International Brotherhood of Electrical Workers
- International Brotherhood of Teamsters
- League of Conservation Voters
- NARAL Pro-Choice America
- National Committee to Preserve Social Security and Medicare
- National Council of La Raza
- National Education Association
- People for the American Way
- Planned Parenthood Action Fund
- Progressive Majority
- ProgressNow Action
- Service Employees International Union
- Sierra Club
- The Voter Participation Center
- United Food and Commercial Workers International Union
- USAction
- VoteVets
- Women's Equality Center
- Working America
