= FEC v. National Conservative PAC =

- Supreme Court of the United States

Argued November 28, 1984 Decided March 18, 1985
- Full case name: Federal Election Commission v. National Conservative Political Action Committee
- Docket no.: 83-1032
- Citations: 470 U.S. 480 (more) 105 S. Ct. 1459; 84 L. Ed. 2d 455; 1985 U.S. LEXIS 66
- Argument: Oral argument
- Opinion announcement: Opinion announcement

Case history
- Prior: 578 F. Supp. 797 (E.D. Pa. 1983)
- Subsequent: Democratic Party of the United States et al. v. National Conservative Political Action Committee et al., No. 83-1122, on appeal from the same court.

Holding
- Defendants' assertion that there was no violation of the Federal Election Campaign Act was protected by the First Amendment, because the limitation of political contribution under the Presidential Election Campaign Fund Act (Fund Act), was a violation of the First Amendment.

Court membership
- Chief Justice Warren E. Burger Associate Justices William J. Brennan Jr. · Byron White; Thurgood Marshall · Harry Blackmun; Lewis F. Powell Jr. · William Rehnquist; John P. Stevens · Sandra Day O'Connor

Case opinions
- Majority: Rehnquist, joined by Burger, Blackmun, O'Connor, Powell, Brennan (Part II), Stevens (Part II)
- Concur/dissent: Stevens
- Dissent: White, joined by Brennan (Part I), Marshall (Part I)
- Dissent: Marshall

Laws applied
- U.S. Const. amend. I; 50 U.S.C. § 33 (1917)

FEC v. National Conservative PAC, 470 U.S. 480 (1985), was a decision by the Supreme Court of the United States striking down expenditure prohibitions of the Federal Election Campaign Act of 1971 (FECA), which regulates the fundraising and spending in political campaigns. The FECA is the primary law that places regulations on campaign financing by limiting the amount that may be contributed. The Act established that no independent political action committee may contribute more than $1,000 to any given presidential candidate in support of a campaign.

A political action committee is an organization that oversees contributions made by members for an electoral candidate. The committee then donates the funding to campaign for or against a candidate.

The Democratic Party of the United States and the Federal Election Commission (FEC) accused the National Conservative Political Action Committee (NCPAC) of violating the Federal Election Campaign Act in 1975. The defendants were accused of violating the expenditure limit implemented by the FECA, with the assertion that the independent contribution was in violation of the Act. The NCPAC expressed concern that the FECA violated the First Amendment.

In response, The Federal Election Commission claimed that the limitation of expenditures held by the FECA was not a violation of the First Amendment. The FEC said that because it is important to protect the integrity of the Government, as well as to uphold the public's perception of integrity, the limitation was necessary and still complied with the First Amendment. The FEC believed private financing could tarnish the protection of integrity and the public's perception. The Commission also believed the FECA would not hinder individual expression, and that ample room was left to freely express oneself under the Act.

Justice William H. Rehnquist concluded in the majority opinion that an attempt to limit spending in support of a presidential candidate, regardless of financial numerical amount, is still an attempt to regulate the First Amendment and the freedom of association, and is therefore unconstitutional.

== Background of the case ==
On November 28, 1984, the FEC v. National Conservative PAC was argued at the Supreme Court level. This case was argued together with Democratic Party v. National Conservative Political Action Committee. Justices of the Supreme Court of the United States often referred to the decision of the 1976 Supreme Court case Buckley v. Valeo when discussing FEC v. NPAC.

The U.S. District Court for the District of Columbia ruled Section 9012(f) unconstitutional in September 1980, regarding three political committees that were not tied with an overall organization. The Presidential Election Campaign Act established that no committee may spend more than $1,000 in support of a candidate, if they were not authorized by a candidate to do so. After the Supreme Court of the United States heard the case on January 19, 1982, the decision came to a split 4 - 4 decision, due to the absence of Justice Sandra O'Connor. This led to the Federal Election Commission enforcing the same previous limitation of expenditures on the NCPAC and the FCM under Section 9012(f).

The Federal Election Commission then introduced another case to the U.S. District Court for the Eastern District of Pennsylvania in order to come to a conclusion as to whether or not Section 9012(f) holds constitutional. Another case, Democratic National Committee v. NCPAC, was filed around the same time. However, the FEC argued that the DNC did not have authorized constitutional standing. In response, the DNC requested clarification by a judge panel to determine the expenditures limitation, and whether or not it held constitutional.

The defendants were accused of making expenditures in excess of the $1,000 limit, violating the Federal Election Campaign Act. The defendants said that this limitation was a violation of the First Amendment. The Supreme Court debated whether or not the dollar limit was of concern, pointing out that if the limit was set to $100, $50, or $1, the limit is still a limit. Essentially, Justice Warren E. Burger noted that any dollar limit, regardless of what numerical value it holds, is a limitation to the freedom of expression.

Both the FEC and Democratic Party of the United States believed that the Federal Election Campaign Act was not in violation of the First Amendment. The Commission said that freedom of expression was hindered under the FECA, despite the limit regulation placed on expenditures. The Democratic Party of the United States emphasized that the FECA allowed candidates to campaign and focus on the most important issues occurring in the country, free of judgment or pressure to persuade in favor of financial support.

Although the trial began on November 28, 1984, it was not until March 18, 1985 that the Supreme Court of the United States reached a decision. The court determined 9012(f) unconstitutional.

== Majority opinion ==
The Supreme Court ruled, 5 – 4, that under the First Amendment, the defendants' freedoms of speech and association was violated because the Court decided regulating expenditures is the same as hindering the freedom of expression.

Writing for the majority, Justice William Rehnquist asserted the opinion over two issues. The majority reversed the decision held by the District Court regarding an initial issue as to the standing of the Democratic Party and its jurisdiction to bring the case into question. The court concluded:

We noted probable jurisdiction pursuant to the statutory appeal provision of § 9011(b)(2), which provides for a direct appeal to this Court from three-judge district courts convened in proceedings under § 9011(b)(1). 466 U.S. 935 (1984). We reverse the judgment of the District Court on the issue of the standing of the Democratic Party and the DNC, but affirm its judgment as to the constitutional validity of § 9012(f).

The majority concluded that the expenditure limit, regardless of how much the limit is set to, under the Federal Election Campaign Act is an infringement on the First Amendment and freedom of association. The court asserted that:

Allowing the presentation of [political] views while forbidding the expenditure of more than $1,000 to present them is much like allowing a speaker in a public hall to express his views while denying him the use of an amplifying system.

The majority also concluded that claims made by those who were in support of the FECA's limitation of expenditures regarding the motive to avoid corruption within elections did not hold, the Court concluded:

Section 9012(f)'s limitation on independent expenditures by political committees is constitutionally infirm, absent any indication that such expenditures have a tendency to corrupt or to give the appearance of corruption.

The court noted that Section 9012(f) shall not restrict these groups from participation in political debates or campaigns, despite Congress' opinion. The court found that these groups were simply expressing the First Amendment, asserting that these groups:

Are quite different from the traditional organizations organized for economic gain [e.g., corporations and labor organizations] that may properly be prohibited from making contributions to political candidates.

The court held that the limitation of expenditures in excess of $1,000, or in any amount, violated the First Amendment. The majority ruled that the Federal Election Campaign Act was unconstitutional, and any individual is free to express participation in a Presidential campaign or election. Congress previously asserted it necessary for these political action groups to be withheld, but the court finalized the decision that this is unconstitutional in the majority opinion.

== Stevens Concurs with part of the decision ==
Justice John Paul Stevens both concurs and dissents in his opinion. He distinguishes his conclusions regarding the participation of the Democratic National Committee, stating he only agrees with the second part held by the majority opinion. Stevens challenges that the decision of the Court in reference to the DNC's standing is not necessary, because ultimately the Supreme Court makes the decisions of appeals. Stevens asserts that:

The fact that the Federal Election Commission also has standing is not, in my opinion, a sufficient reason for concluding that it was not appropriate for DNC to commence this action regardless of whether or not the FEC elected to participate.

== White's dissent ==
Justice Byron White wrote the dissenting opinion and was then joined by Justice Thurgood Marshall who also stated his dissent.

Justice White concluded in his dissent that campaign spending regulations are constitutional and that there is a difference between freedom of speech restrictions and freedom of spending money. He states:

The First Amendment protects the right to speak, not the right to spend, and limitations on the amount of money that can be spent are not the same as restrictions on speaking. I agree with the majority that the expenditures in this case "produce" core First Amendment speech. See ante at 470 U. S. 493. But that is precisely the point: they produce such speech; they are not speech itself.

White asserted that the case the Supreme Court had referred to, Buckley v. Valeo, was not decided correctly. White concluded that the expenditures in campaigns ought to be regulated in favor of the government's interests. He asserts:

Congressional regulation of the amassing and spending of money in political campaigns without doubt involves First Amendment concerns, but restrictions such as the one at issue here are supported by governmental interests -- including, but not limited to, the need to avoid real or apparent corruption -- sufficiently compelling to withstand scrutiny.

White believed that even despite the outcome of Buckley v. Valeo, the case was not correctly referenced in regard to FEC v. NPAC, the current case. He asserted that Section 9012(f) was more appropriately related to the Buckley v. Valeo case and that it did not hold the same in the current case. He states:

The provision challenged here more closely resembles the contribution limitations that were upheld in Buckley and later cases than the limitations on uncoordinated individual expenditures that were struck down.

== Marshall's dissent ==
Justice Thurgood Marshall, who joined Justice White in the dissent, asserted his change in opinion that he too believes the interests of the government can justify expenditures. He states:

Unlike contributions, such independent expenditures may well provide little assistance to the candidate's campaign, and may indeed prove counterproductive. The absence of prearrangement and coordination of an expenditure with the candidate or his agent not only undermines the value of the expenditure to the candidate, but also alleviates the danger that expenditures will be given as a quid pro quo for improper commitments from the candidate.

Marshall dissents that the impact of limitations on expenditures and contributions on First Amendment freedoms are critically different. He states:

First, the underlying rights at issue -- freedom of speech and freedom of association -- are both core First Amendment rights. Second, in both cases, the regulation is of the same form: it concerns the amount of money that can be spent for political activity. Thus, I do not see how one interest can be deemed more compelling than the other.

Justice Marshall writes his dissent with references to the 1976 Supreme Court case, Buckley v. Valeo. Marshall states that he no longer agrees with the distinction concluded in the Buckley v. Valeo case. Marshall concludes that the limitation of independent expenditures is necessary to maintain integrity in the Government and the public's perception of integrity. He concludes:

I have come to believe that the limitations on independent expenditures challenged in that case and here are justified by the congressional interests in promoting "the reality and appearance of equal access to the political arena," id. at 424 U. S. 287, and in eliminating political corruption and the appearance of such corruption.

== Subsequent developments ==
Previous Supreme Court cases, such as Buckley v. Valeo and Democratic National Committee v. NCPAC, set the precedent for the decision in FEC v. NPAC. However, all of these cases are important in setting the precedent for future cases to come. FEC v. NPAC establishes that, under the First Amendment, it is constitutional to make expenditures in support of a candidate's campaign in any dollar amount. The freedom of expression must not be hindered by the restriction or limitation of expenditures.

Candidates have traditionally financed campaigns through private, voluntary contributions in both the United States and other democratic nations. Thus, the idea of public funding in support of a political candidate naturally received opposition. However, Supreme Court decisions, such as FEC. v. NPAC, have developed the concept of public funding. The FEC. v. NPAC decision began to establish a sense of normality in public funding for elections.

In 2014, the Supreme Court revisited issues imposed by the FECA. McCutcheon v. Federal Election Commission was a Supreme Court decision that declared imposing an aggregate contribution limit on an individual over a two-year period to national party and federal candidate committees unconstitutional. In a 5–4 decision, Supreme Court Justices decided that this was a violation of the First Amendment.

Federal campaign finance regulations have been altered substantially since the first law was introduced in 1867. Public financing has been declared constitutional, and has since been normalized from past private financing traditions. Individuals have the right under the First Amendment to exercise the freedom of expression, and contribute financially to election campaigns, whether those funds are to campaign for or against a candidate.

== See also ==
- List of United States Supreme Court cases, volume 250
- FEC v. Wisconsin Right to Life, Inc.
- FEC v. Massachusetts Citizens for Life
- Citizens United v. Federal Election Commission
