= 527 organization =

Type of U.S. tax-exempt organization

A 527 organization or 527 group is a type of U.S. tax-exempt organization organized under Section 527 of the U.S. Internal Revenue Code (26 U.S.C. § 527). A 527 group is created primarily to influence the selection, nomination, election, appointment or defeat of candidates to federal, state or local public office.

Technically, almost all political committees, including state, local, and federal candidate committees, traditional political action committees (PACs), super PACs, and political parties are "527s". However, in common practice the term is usually applied only to such organizations that are not regulated under state or federal campaign finance laws because they do not "expressly advocate" for the election or defeat of a candidate or party.

There are no upper limits on contributions to 527s and no restrictions on who may contribute. There are no spending limits imposed on these organizations. The organizations must register with the Internal Revenue Service (IRS), publicly disclose their donors and file periodic reports of contributions and expenditures.

Because they may not expressly advocate for specific candidates or coordinate with any candidate's campaign, many 527s are used to raise money to spend on issue advocacy and voter mobilization. Examples of 527s are Swift Boat Veterans for Truth, The Media Fund, America Coming Together, the Progress for America Voter Fund, and the Secretary of State Project.

== Legal history ==
Internal Revenue Code section 527 was enacted as part of Public Law No. 93-625 on January 3, 1975. In the case of Buckley v. Valeo, the U.S. Supreme Court attempted to draw a limit on the extent to which campaign finance laws could regulate speech about politics. The Court's answer was that campaign finance laws could reach only party and candidate committees, organizations with the major purpose of electing candidates, or speech that "expressly advocated" the election or defeat of candidates. The determination of whether a group had the major purpose of electing candidates depended, in turn, on whether "express advocacy" was the group's primary activity. In footnote 6 of the Buckley opinion, the Court limited "express advocacy" to words and phrases such as "Smith for Congress", "elect", "defeat", or other specific calls for action to vote for or against a candidate. Thus, organizations could run ads discussing candidates and issues without being subject to campaign finance restrictions, so long as they avoided such express advocacy.

The 2002 McCain-Feingold law, also known as the Bipartisan Campaign Reform Act, extended certain campaign finance limitations to broadcast advertisements run within 60 days of a general election or 30 days of a primary election if they mentioned a candidate, regardless of whether or not they contained "express advocacy". The Supreme Court upheld the constitutionality of this provision in McConnell v. Federal Election Commission (2003). Based on that decision, many persons urged the Federal Election Commission (FEC) to use its regulatory power to extend campaign finance laws to cover these groups. The Commission held hearings in April 2004 to determine whether or not 527s should be regulated under campaign finance rules, but concluded that the law did not cover these independent 527 organizations unless they directly advocated the election or defeat of a candidate or engaged in broadcast advertising, as specified in the McCain-Feingold law. Nevertheless, FEC rulings after the 2004 election attempted to extend the reach of the law to advertisements which questioned a candidate's character and fitness for office off limits to 527s specifically.

- On September 18, 2009, the Federal Appeals Court in Washington, D.C., ruled that these groups have a First Amendment right to raise and spend freely to influence elections so long as they do not coordinate their activities with a candidate or a party.
- In January 2010, the Supreme Court decision in Citizens United v. FEC held that the government may not keep corporations or unions from spending money to support or denounce individual candidates in elections. While corporations or unions may not give money directly to campaigns or coordinate their activity with campaigns, they may seek to persuade the voting public through independent expenditure groups.
- In July 2010, the U.S. District Court of Appeals for the D.C. Circuit ruling in Speechnow.org v. Federal Election Commission struck down fundraising limits on independent expenditure-only committees, (commonly known as Super PACs) which, like 527s, can raise unlimited amounts of money from individuals, unions, associations and corporations to influence elections. These PACs must also disclose their finances to the FEC and cannot coordinate with candidates or political parties. The difference is that the Super PACs can "expressly advocate" for or against a candidate. The Speechnow.org and Citizens United decisions made 527s much less valuable as a medium of political communication, and their use declined substantially in the elections of 2010 and 2012.

In Carey v. FEC (2012), Rear Admiral James J. Carey, USN (ret), chairman of the National Defense PAC, along with the PAC and a prospective donor, brought suit after the FEC deadlocked on a 2010 Advisory Opinion Request (see AO 2010-20), in which the PAC sought permission to operate both an independent expenditure PAC and a traditional PAC that could make contributions to candidates and was subject to fundraising restrictions. Carey's victory in the court now allows organizations to operate both traditional and super PACs.

== Public opinion ==
A February 2010 poll from the Pew Research Center found that 68 percent of Americans disapprove of the Supreme Court's decision in Citizens United v. FEC to allow corporations to make expenditures on behalf of candidates during elections. Seventeen percent approve of the expenditures, and 15 percent of respondents said they were unsure.

An October 2010 Bloomberg poll found that 47 percent of Americans say they would be less likely to support a political candidate if his campaign was supported by advertising paid for by anonymous business groups. According to the pollster, 41 percent said that it would not matter, and 9 percent said they would be more likely to back the candidate.

== 2004 election controversy ==
Although 527 organizations were in common use by the 1990s, in the wake of the Bipartisan Campaign Reform Act, which limited the ability of political parties to raise money, 527s rose to much greater prominence and visibility. Swift Boat was one such group, which ran controversial and highly effective ads critical of the 2004 Democratic Party candidate, John Kerry. A reported $9.45 million came from just 3 private individuals. On the liberal side, contributor George Soros contributed $23.7 million to 527s, and Peter Lewis of Progressive Insurance contributed another $23.2 million to 527s in 2004. Prominent 527s that supported Democrats included America Coming Together, MoveOn.org, and the Media Fund.

Under federal election law, coordination between an election campaign and a 527 group is not allowed. The heavy spending of key 527 groups to attack presidential candidates brought complaints to the Federal Elections Commission of illegal coordination between the groups and rival political campaigns. These formal complaints included:

- On May 5, 2004, the Republican National Committee accused MoveOn.org, The Media Fund, America Coming Together and America Votes of coordinating their efforts with the John Kerry campaign.
- On August 20, 2004, John Kerry's campaign accused Swift Boat Veterans for Truth of coordinating their efforts with the George W. Bush campaign.

In 2006 and 2007 the FEC fined a number of organizations, including MoveOn and Swift Boat Veterans for Truth, for violations arising from the 2004 campaign. The FEC's rationale was that these groups had specifically advocated the election or defeat of candidates, thus making them subject to federal regulation and its limits on contributions to the organizations.

== Top 20 federally focused and state focused 527 groups ==
=== 2018 election cycle ===
Some of these listings identify a parent organization that has created a 527 group but that also engages in many nonpolitical activities. Republican/conservative leaning groups are highlighted in pink, Democratic/liberal leaning groups are highlighted in blue, neutral groups are not highlighted.

Rank	Name	2018 Fundraising	2018 Expenditures
1	Republican Governors Association	$150,387,931	$167,835,847
2	Democratic Governors Association	$95,779,024	$96,371,376
3	ActBlue	$92,101,947	$74,272,425
4	Republican State Leadership Committee	$45,283,573	$49,998,382
5	American Federation of State, County, and Municipal Employees	$41,390,913	$40,318,034
6	Republican Attorneys General Association	$40,640,124	$50,936,229
7	Democratic Legislative Campaign Committee	$32,918,509	$32,203,180
8	EMILY's List	$28,529,793	$26,332,838
9	Service Employees International Union	$27,465,223	$29,319,705
10	Democratic Attorneys General Association	$20,373,246	$20,503,622
11	Citizens United	$18,526,147	$18,828,337
12	American Federation of Teachers	$17,927,893	$21,072,933
13	Laborers Union	$15,974,447	$16,024,116
14	A Stronger Michigan	$15,138,050	$15,138,049
15	State Victory Action	$14,905,000	$14,713,267
16	National Democratic Redistricting Committee	$14,221,188	$13,413,926
17	American Comeback Committee	$14,117,837	$15,839,410
18	Garden State Forward	$13,742,250	$4,981,083
19	National Association of Realtors	$13,405,000	$9,017,937
20	A Stronger Wisconsin	$12,062,035	$12,062,035
As of March 2021. Sources:

=== 2010 election cycle ===
Some of these listings identify a parent organization that has created a 527 group but that also engages in many nonpolitical activities. Republican/conservative leaning groups are highlighted in pink, Democratic/liberal leaning groups are highlighted in blue.

A total of $415,784,148 was spent by these organizations alone, $214,580,543 of which was spent by Republican/conservative groups and $201,203,605 of which was spent by Democratic/liberal groups.

Rank	Name	2010 Fundraising	2010 Expenditures
1	Republican Governors Association	$117,129,464	$131,823,354
2	Democratic Governors Association	$55,362,218	$64,708,253
3	American Federation of State, County, and Municipal Employees	$47,068,586	$46,520,548
4	Republican State Leadership Committee	$29,504,912	$29,911,967
5	American Solutions for Winning the Future	$28,233,447	$28,419,764
6	Service Employees International Union	$14,923,663	$15,534,072
7	Citizens United	$9,211,311	$9,185,145
8	EMILY's List	$9,001,964	$10,439,329
9	America Votes	$8,883,561	$11,237,974
10	Democratic Legislative Campaign Committee	$8,684,721	$10,949,775
11	College Republican National Committee	$8,389,738	$8,621,662
12	National Education Association	$7,394,838	$7,503,113
13	Citizens for Strength and Security	$7,127,814	$7,216,173
14	American Crossroads	$6,700,312	$1,408,323
15	Democratic Attorneys General Association	$6,365,202	$7,206,207
16	GOPAC	$5,600,547	$5,210,328
17	International Brotherhood of Electrical Workers	$5,354,930	$6,685,747
18	ActBlue	$4,994,165	$4,719,415
19	Laborers Union	$4,578,278	$4,361,153
20	American Federation of State, County, Municipal Employees	$4,123,743	$4,121,846

=== 2008 election cycle ===
Some of these listings identify a parent organization that has created a 527 group but that also engages in many nonpolitical activities. Democratic/liberal leaning groups are highlighted in blue, Republican/conservative leaning groups are highlighted in pink.

A total of $303,309,245 was spent by these organizations alone, $178,397,267 of which was spent by Democratic/liberal groups and $117,112,322 of which was spent by Republican/conservative groups.

Rank	Name	2008 Fundraising	2008 Expenditures
1	Republican Governors Association	$58,942,154	$44,625,517
2	Democratic Governors Association	$35,831,960	$26,376,784
3	American Federation of State, County, Municipal Employees	$32,867,824	$30,652,149
4	Service Employees International Union	$27,432,667	$27,839,177
5	America Votes	$25,959,173	$24,491,324
6	American Solutions for Winning the Future	$22,722,547	$22,966,088
7	Republican State Leadership Committee	$19,961,136	$20,981,193
8	Change to Win	$13,917,202	$7,799,656
9	EMILY'S List	$13,659,555	$12,910,515
10	The Fund for America	$12,142,046	$12,142,044
11	Democratic Legislative Campaign Committee	$9,989,627	$12,665,087
12	GOPAC	$9,322,764	$9,407,146
13	Patriot Majority Fund	$8,266,627	$8,108,121
14	College Republican National Committee	$6,956,285	$7,537,976
15	RightChange.com	$6,736,563	$5,578,187
16	Democratic Attorneys General Association	$6,704,076	$5,441,100
17	UNITE HERE	$6,480,432	$6,957,280
18	Citizens United	$6,477,080	$6,016,215
19	All Children Matter	$6,031,500	$3,368,861
20	Progressive Majority	$5,743,779	$7,444,825

=== 2006 election cycle ===
Some of these listings identify a parent organization that has created a 527 group but that also engages in many nonpolitical activities. Democratic/liberal leaning groups are highlighted in blue, Republican/conservative leaning groups are highlighted in pink.

A total of $171,045,165 was spent by these organizations alone, $121,665,587 of which was spent by Democratic/liberal groups and $49,379,578 of which was spent by Republican/conservative groups.

Rank	Name	2006 Fundraising	2006 Expenditures
1	Republican Governors Association	$28,798,367	$15,993,537
2	Service Employees International Union	$25,053,546	$28,212,510
3	Democratic Governors Association	$18,526,787	$8,508,850
4	America Votes	$14,391,893	$14,106,236
5	EMILY's List	$11,776,201	$11,128,005
6	Republican State Leadership Committee	$11,340,863	$10,132,510
7	American Federation of State, County, and Municipal Employees	$9,599,404	$8,336,574
8	Club for Growth	$7,217,080	$8,157,383
9	Change to Win	$7,061,423	$2,592,376
10	Progress for America	$6,175,025	$13,000,574
11	International Brotherhood of Electrical Workers	$5,538,113	$5,529,067
12	September Fund	$5,230,500	$4,950,861
13	Economic Freedom Fund	$5,050,450	$4,835,805
14	America Coming Together	$4,494,107	$6,998,238
15	Democratic Legislative Campaign Committee	$4,365,495	$3,928,487
16	Democratic Attorneys General Association	$4,083,576	$2,630,350
17	College Republican National Committee	$3,720,110	$10,260,343
18	Laborers' International Union of North America	$3,688,250	$3,762,110
19	Progressive Majority	$3,262,427	$4,845,486
20	Bluegrass Freedom Fund	$3,150,125	$3,135,863
As of June 30, 2008. Source: Source:

=== 2004 election cycle ===
Some of these listings identify a parent organization that has created a 527 group but that also engages in many nonpolitical activities. Democratic/liberal leaning groups are highlighted in blue, Republican/conservative leaning groups are highlighted in pink.

A total of $439,709,105 was spent by these organizations alone, $307,324,096 of which was spent by Democratic/liberal groups and $132,385,009 of which was spent by Republican/conservative groups.

Rank	Name	2004 Fundraising	2004 Expenditures
1	America Coming Together	$79,795,487	$78,040,480
2	Joint Victory Campaign 2004*	$71,811,666	$72,588,053
3	Media Fund	$59,414,183	$57,694,580
4	Service Employees International Union	$48,385,367	$47,695,646
5	Progress For America	$44,929,174	$35,631,378
6	Republican Governors Association	$33,848,421	$34,301,889
7	Democratic Governors Association	$24,172,761	$24,125,938
8	American Federation of State, County, and Municipal Employees	$22,227,050	$22,332,587
9	Swift Vets and POWs for Truth	$17,008,090	$22,565,360
10	MoveOn.org	$12,956,215	$21,565,803
11	College Republican National Committee	$12,780,126	$17,260,655
12	New Democrat Network	$12,726,158	$12,524,063
13	Citizens for a Strong Senate	$10,853,730	$10,228,515
14	Republican State Leadership Committee	$10,762,907	$10,682,312
15	Club for Growth	$10,645,976	$11,943,415
16	Sierra Club	$8,727,127	$6,261,811
17	EMILY's List	$7,739,946	$8,100,752
18	Voices for Working Families	$7,466,056	$7,202,695
19	AFL–CIO	$6,583,572	$6,473,110
20	League of Conservation Voters	$6,049,500	$5,078,116
As of June 30, 2008.

*Joint Victory Campaign 2004 is a joint fund-raising committee run by America Coming Together and the Media Fund. Money raised by JVC is divided between these two beneficiaries. Combining receipts for these three groups would result in double-counting.

== See also ==
- 501(c)(3)
- 501(c)(4)
- Campaign finance in the United States
- Campaign finance reform in the United States
- Issue versus express advocacy
- Opposition research
- Political action committee
