= Gloria Totten =

American activist

- Occupation: Nonprofit executive

Gloria Totten is a nonprofit executive. She is the founder and president of the Public Leadership Institute, that develops model legislation designed to protect access to legalized abortion. Totten previously worked at Progressive Majority from 2001-2015, served as political director of NARAL from 1996-2001, and was the Executive Director for Maryland's state chapter of NARAL from 1993-1996. She also he worked as the education director for Pro-Choice Resources, president and lobbyist for the Minnesota Coalition Against Sexual Assault, and media chair for It's Time Minnesota.
