= Media Fund =

American political fundraising group

The Media Fund is a 527 group, active in U.S. politics, which supported Democrat John Kerry's campaign for President. It was organized in November 2003 and was led by, and is led by Harold M. Ickes, a former aide to President Bill Clinton. Its chief fundraiser is Ellen Malcolm, a former fundraiser for EMILY's List. Billionaire George Soros was among the largest donors to the Fund. According to the New York Times, the Media Fund raised $45 million to run issue ads in key swing states. The Media Fund is one of several 527 groups which supported Kerry; others include America Coming Together and MoveOn.org. After the election, the group experienced a dramatic drop in fundraising success; media reports speculated that major donors had given up on the organization, and were turning their attention to other, more long-term Democratic projects.

== Legal issues ==
The group was fined by the Federal Election Commission (FEC) in 2007. The $580,000 fine the seventh highest the FEC had levied—resulted from a settlement between the fund and the regulator. Groups including the Republican National Committee and Bush's reelection team had complained to the FEC about election law violations. The FEC found that the Media Fund had improperly accepted contributions from unions and corporations as well as contributions from individuals over the $5,000 cap. According to a spokesperson, Media Fund did not admit to any wrongdoing in its settlement.
