= Progressive Majority =

- Formation: 2001
- Type: PAC
- Legal status: defunct
- Headquarters: 1825 K St. NW Suite 450, Washington, DC, 20006
- President: Gloria Totten
- Website: www.progressivemajority.org

Progressive Majority was an American political action committee that recruited, trained, and campaigned on behalf of progressive politicians for state and local offices. Founded in 2001, the group's stated mission is "to elect progressive champions."

== Overview ==
When founded, Progressive Majority assisted progressive candidates in both state and federal elections. After one election cycle, the organization decided to focus on down-ballot races in order to build a pipeline or farm team of progressive candidates for higher office. In order to receive the backing of Progressive Majority, prospective candidates must receive a 100 percent score on a forty-item questionnaire that tests their commitment to "economic justice and civil rights, including gay rights, public education, universal healthcare, environmental protection and abortion."

Offices were opened in Washington, Wisconsin, and Pennsylvania in 2004, and the organization expanded to Colorado and Arizona in 2005. The California office opened in 2006, and offices opened in Minnesota and Ohio in 2007. Progressive journalist John Nichols of The Nation credited Progressive Majority with helping the Democratic Party achieve state legislative victories in 2006.

Progressive Majority, before being acquired by Wellstone Action collaborated, among others but chiefly with Democracy for America. It was a partner of America Votes and had received some funding from Democracy Alliance.
