= FEC v. Massachusetts Citizens for Life =

Federal Election Commission v. Massachusetts Citizens for Life, Inc.
- Supreme Court of the United States

Argued October 7, 1986 Decided December 15, 1986
- Full case name: Federal Election Commission v. Massachusetts Citizens for Life, Inc.
- Docket no.: 85-701
- Citations: 479 U.S. 238 (more) 107 S. Ct. 616; 93 L. Ed. 2d 539; 1986 U.S. LEXIS 26

Holding
- Massachusetts Citizens for Life violated the Federal Election Campaign Act by distributing flyers asking voters to vote "for life" paid for with treasury funds, however that section of FECA itself violated the First Amendment.

Court membership
- Chief Justice William Rehnquist Associate Justices William J. Brennan Jr. · Byron White; Thurgood Marshall · Harry Blackmun; Lewis F. Powell Jr. · John P. Stevens; Sandra Day O'Connor · Antonin Scalia

Case opinions
- Majority: Brennan (Parts I and II), joined by unanimous
- Majority: Brennan (Parts III–B and III–C), joined by Marshall, Powell, O'Connor, Scalia
- Plurality: Brennan (Part III–A), joined by Marshall, Powell, Scalia
- Concurrence: O'Connor (in part and in judgment)
- Concur/dissent: Rehnquist, joined by White, Blackmun, Stevens

Laws applied
- U.S. Const. amend. I

FEC v. Massachusetts Citizens for Life was a lawsuit filed by the US Federal Election Commission.

== Massachusetts Citizens for Life ==
Massachusetts Citizens for Life was a nonprofit corporation, aiming to "defend the right to life of all human beings born and unborn," with advocacy activities.

It published a newsletter. In September, 1978, Massachusetts Citizens for Life distributed a "Special Edition" telling people to vote "pro-life" in the primary elections. It listed candidates for every office in every voting district in Massachusetts, and labeled each candidate as supporting or rejecting their views. The publication was distributed to a larger audience than that of the standard newsletter (the general public, not just supporters). It was financed by money taken from Massachusetts Citizens for Life's general treasury funds.

A Federal Election Commission complaint was filed. Claiming the "Special Edition" violated § 316; funds used from a corporate treasury to distribute a campaign flyer (of certain political candidates) toward the general public. The FEC determined probable cause of a violation of the statute. The FEC then led a complaint in Federal District Court.

== Case ==
In Federal Election Commission v. Massachusetts Citizens for Life, Inc., 479 U.S. 238 (1986), the U.S. Supreme Court ruled that Massachusetts Citizens for Life, Inc., a pro-life organization, violated the Federal Election Campaign Act (FECA) by distributing flyers asking voters to vote "for life" paid for with treasury funds. The court also ruled that the FECA section that required corporate spending on political campaigns be done through political action committees (PACs) was itself a violation of the First Amendment rights.

== See also ==
- FEC v. National Conservative PAC
- FEC v. Wisconsin Right to Life, Inc.
- Citizens United v. FEC
