= 501(c) organization =

Type of tax-exempt nonprofit organization in the United States

In United States federal law, a 501(c) organization is a nonprofit organization according to Internal Revenue Code (26 U.S.C. § 501(c)). Such organizations are exempt from some federal income taxes. Sections 503 through 505 set out the requirements for obtaining such exemptions. Many states refer to Section 501(c) for definitions of organizations exempt from state taxation as well. 501(c) organizations can receive unlimited contributions from individuals, corporations, and unions.

For example, a nonprofit organization may be tax-exempt under section 501(c)(3) if its primary activities are charitable, religious, educational, scientific, literary, testing for public safety, or preventing cruelty to children or animals.

== Types ==
According to the IRS Publication 557, in the Organization Reference Chart section, the following is an exact list of 501(c) organization types (29 in total) and their corresponding descriptions. (Note: In accordance with the Internal Security Act of 1950, any 501(c), 501(d), or 521 organization loses its tax-exempt status in any taxable year during which the organization is a communist-action organization or a communist-infiltrated organization.)

Organization type	Description
501(c)(1)	Corporations Organized Under Act of Congress, including Federal Credit Unions and National Farm Loan Associations
501(c)(2)	Title-holding Corporations for Exempt Organizations
501(c)(3)	Religious, Educational, Charitable, Scientific, Literary, Testing for Public Safety, to Foster National or International Amateur Sports Competition, or Prevention of Cruelty to Children or Animals Organizations
501(c)(4)	Civic Leagues, Social Welfare Organizations, and Local Associations of Employees
501(c)(5)	Labor, Agricultural and Horticultural Organizations
501(c)(6)	Business Leagues, Chambers of Commerce, Real Estate Boards
501(c)(7)	Social and Recreational Clubs
501(c)(8)	Fraternal Beneficiary Societies and Associations
501(c)(9)	Voluntary Employee Beneficiary Associations
501(c)(10)	Domestic Fraternal Societies and Associations
501(c)(11)	Teachers' Retirement Fund Associations
501(c)(12)	Benevolent Life Insurance Associations, Mutual Ditch or Irrigation Companies, Mutual or Cooperative Telephone Companies, and Like Organizations
501(c)(13)	Cemetery Companies
501(c)(14)	State-Chartered Credit Unions, Mutual Reserve Funds
501(c)(15)	Mutual Insurance Companies or Associations
501(c)(16)	Cooperative Organizations to Finance Crop Operations
501(c)(17)	Supplemental Unemployment Benefit Trusts
501(c)(18)	Employee Funded Pension Trust (created before June 25, 1959)
501(c)(19)	Post or Organization of Past or Present Members of the Armed Forces
501(c)(20)	Group Legal Services Plan Organizations (Note: 501(c)(20) organizations are no longer tax-exempt under Section 501(c)(20) after June 30, 1992, but they may request to become exempt under Section 501(c)(9) effective July 1, 1992.)
501(c)(21)	Black Lung Benefit Trusts
501(c)(22)	Withdrawal Liability Payment Fund
501(c)(23)	Veterans Organizations (created before 1880) (Note: Veterans organizations may be exempt under Section 501(c)(23) only if the organization was created before 1880. Other veterans organizations may be exempt under Section 501(c)(4) instead.)
501(c)(24)	Section 4049 ERISA Trusts (Note: 501(c)(24) organizations are described as Section 4049 ERISA Trusts; Section 4049 of ERISA has been repealed.)
501(c)(25)	Real Property Title-Holding Corporations or Trusts with Multiple Parents
501(c)(26)	State-Sponsored Organization Providing Health Coverage for High-Risk Individuals
501(c)(27)	State-Sponsored Workers' Compensation Reinsurance Organization
501(c)(28)	National Railroad Retirement Investment Trust
501(c)(29)	Qualified Nonprofit Health Insurance Issuers (Note: The Section 501(c)(29) tax exemption for qualified nonprofit health Insurance issuers was created in section 1322(h)(1) of the Affordable Care Act)

== General compliance ==
A 501(c) organization is subject to tax on its unrelated business income. For most organizations, an organization's activity generates unrelated business income if it is regularly carried on and it is not substantially related to furthering the exempt purpose of the organization. There are several exceptions to this.

Disposal of donated goods valued over $2,500, or acceptance of goods worth over $5,000 may trigger special filing and record-keeping requirements.

A 501(c) organization must maintain proper records and file certain annual or special-purpose tax returns, e.g., 26 U.S.C. § 6033 and 26 U.S.C. § 6050L. Prior to 2008, an annual return was not generally required from an exempt organization with less than $25,000 in gross income yearly. Since 2008, most organizations whose annual gross receipts are less than $50,000 must file an annual information return known as Form 990-N. (Note: Organizations that are not eligible to file Form 990-N include private foundations, most section 509(a)(3) supporting organizations, and organizations exempt under Section 501(c)(1), 501(c)(20), 501(c)(23), 501(c)(24), 501(d), 527, 529, 4947(a)(2), 4947(a)(1).) Form 990-N, Form 990, Form 990-EZ, and Form 990-PF must be submitted electronically.

Failure to file required returns such as Form 990 (Return of Organization Exempt From Income Tax) may result in fines of up to $250,000 per year. Exempt or political organizations, excluding churches or similar religious entities, must make their returns, reports, notices, and exempt applications available for public inspection. The organization's Form 990 (or similar such public record as the Form 990-EZ or Form 990-PF) must be available for public inspection and photocopying at the offices of the exempt organization, through a written request and payment for photocopies by mail from the exempt organization, or through a direct Form 4506-A "Request for Public Inspection or Copy or Political Organization IRS Form" request to the IRS of for the past three tax years. Form 4506-A also allows the public inspection or photocopying access to Form 1023 "Application for Recognition of Exemption" or Form 1024, Form 8871 "Political Organization Notice of Section 527 Status", and Form 8872 "Political Organization Report of Contribution and Expenditures". Internet access to many organizations' 990 and some other forms are available through GuideStar. (Note: Guidestar access to recent 990 filings is available for free, but requires one to open a free account.) Certain organizations are exempt from filing Form 990, such as churches, their integrated auxiliaries, and conventions or associations of churches; the exclusively religious activities of any religious order; and religious organizations; and most organizations whose annual gross receipts are less than $5,000. Failure to file such timely returns and to make other specific information available to the public also is prohibited.

Between 2010 and 2017 the IRS revoked the nonprofit status of more than 760,000 nonprofit organizations for failing to file the 990 form.

== 501(c)(3) ==
501(c)(3) tax-exemptions apply to entities that are organized and operated exclusively for religious, charitable, scientific, literary, or educational purposes; or for testing for public safety, to foster national or international amateur sports competition, or for the prevention of cruelty to children or animals. The 501(c)(3) exemption also applies for any unincorporated community chest, fund, cooperating association, or foundation that is organized and operated exclusively for those purposes. There are also supporting organizations—often referred to in shorthand form as "Friends of" organizations. 26 U.S.C. § 170, provides a deduction, for federal income tax purposes, for some donors who make charitable contributions to most types of 501(c)(3) organizations, among others.

The IRS explains that to be tax-exempt, "an organization must be organized and operated exclusively for

... and none of its earnings may inure to any private shareholder or individual." Private inurement means that the organization's assets must not unduly benefit a person.

Organizations described in section 501(c)(3) are prohibited from conducting political campaign activities to intervene in elections to public office. On the other hand, public charities (but not private foundations) may conduct a limited amount of lobbying to influence legislation. Although the law states that "No substantial part..." of a public charity's activities can go to lobbying, charities may register for a 501(h) election allowing them to lawfully conduct lobbying activities as long as their financial expenditure does not exceed a specified amount. 501(c)(3) organizations risk loss of tax exempt status if any of these rules are violated.

A 501(c)(3) organization is allowed to conduct some or all of its charitable activities outside the United States. Donors' contributions to a 501(c)(3) organization are tax-deductible only if the contribution is for the use of the 501(c)(3) organization, and that the 501(c)(3) organization is not merely serving as an agent or conduit of a foreign charitable organization. Additional procedures are required of 501(c)(3) organizations that are private foundations.

== 501(c)(4) ==
A 501(c)(4) organization is a social welfare organization, such as a civic organization or a neighborhood association. An organization is considered by the IRS to be operated exclusively for the promotion of social welfare if it is primarily engaged in promoting the common good and general welfare of the people of the community. Net earnings must be exclusively used for charitable, educational, or recreational purposes.

According to The Washington Post, 501(c)(4) organizations:

...are allowed to participate in politics, so long as politics do not become their primary focus. What that means in practice is that they must spend less than 50 percent of their money on politics. So long as they don't run afoul of that threshold, the groups can influence elections, which they typically do through advertising.

=== Allowed activities ===
501(c)(4)s are similar to 501(c)(5)s and 501(c)(6)s in that the organizations may inform the public on controversial subjects and attempt to influence legislation relevant to its program. Unlike 501(c)(3) organizations, they may also participate in political campaigns and elections, as long as their primary activity is the promotion of social welfare and related to the organization's purpose.

The income tax exemption for 501(c)(4) organizations applies to most of their operations, but income spent on political activities—generally the advocacy of a particular candidate in an election—is taxable. An "action" organization generally qualifies as a 501(c)(4) organization. An "action" organization is one whose activities substantially include, or are exclusively, direct or grassroots lobbying related to advocacy for or against legislation or proposing, supporting, or opposing legislation that is related to its purpose.

A 501(c)(4) organization may directly or indirectly support or oppose a candidate for public office as long as such activities are not a substantial amount of its activities.

A 501(c)(4) organization that lobbies must register with the Clerk of the House if it lobbies members of the House or their staff. Likewise, a 501(c)(4) organization must register with the Secretary of the Senate if it lobbies members of the Senate or their staff. In addition, the 501(c)(4) organization must either inform its members the amount it spends on lobbying or pay a proxy tax to the Internal Revenue Service. Lobbying expenses and political expenses are not deductible as business expenses.

==== Electioneering communications ====
The use of 501(c)(4), 501(c)(5), and 501(c)(6) organizations has been affected by the 2007 case FEC v. Wisconsin Right to Life, Inc., in which the Supreme Court struck down the part of the McCain-Feingold Act that prohibited 501(c)(4)s, 501(c)(5)s, and 501(c)(6)s from broadcasting electioneering communications. The Act defined an electioneering communication as a communication that mentions a candidate's name 60 days before a primary or 30 days before a general election.

=== Contributions ===
Contributions to 501(c)(4) organizations are not tax-deductible as charitable donations unless the organization is either a volunteer fire department or a veterans organization. Dues or contributions to 501(c)(4) organizations may be deductible as a business expense under IRC 162, although amounts paid for intervention or participation in any political campaign, direct lobbying, grass roots lobbying, and contact with certain federal officials are not deductible. If a 501(c)(4) engages in a substantial number of these activities, then only the amount of dues or contributions that can be attributed to other activities may be deductible as a business expense.

The organization must provide a notice to its members containing a reasonable estimate of the amount related to lobbying and political campaign expenditures, or else it is subject to a proxy tax on its lobbying and political campaign expenditures. It must also state that contributions to the organization are not deductible as charitable contributions during fundraising.

A 501(c)(4) organization is not required to disclose their donors publicly, with the exception of organizations that make independent expenditures as of 2018. The former complete lack of disclosure led to extensive use of the 501(c)(4) provisions for organizations that are actively involved in lobbying, and has become controversial. Criticized as "dark money", spending from these organizations on political advertisements has exceeded spending from Super PACs. Spending by organizations that do not disclose their donors increased from less than $5.2 million in 2006 to well over $300 million during the 2012 election season.

Every organization, including a 501(c)(4) organization, that expressly advocates for the election or defeat of a particular political candidate and spends more than $250 during a calendar year must disclose the name of each person who contributed more than $200 during the calendar year to the Federal Election Commission. The Federal Election Commission is required to enforce this provision based on a federal court decision in 2018."

=== History ===
The origins of 501(c)(4) organizations date back to the Revenue Act of 1913, which created a new group of tax-exempt organizations dedicated to social welfare in a precursor to what is now Internal Revenue Code Section 501(c)(4).

The Protecting Americans from Tax Hikes Act of 2015 introduced a new requirement on 501(c)(4) organizations. Within 60 days of the organization's formation, a 501(c)(4) organization is required to file Form 8976 with the Internal Revenue Service as notification that it is operating as a section 501(c)(4) organization. The Internal Revenue Service will acknowledge receipt of the notification, but the acknowledgment is not a determination that the organization qualifies for section 501(c)(4) tax-exempt status. A 501(c)(4) organization is not required to send the notification if the organization was formed on or before July 8, 2016, and it either applied for a determination letter using Form 1024 or filed a Form 990 between December 19, 2015, and July 8, 2016.

As of January 2018, the application for recognition of exemption as a 501(c)(4) organization is a new form, Form 1024-A, rather than Form 1024.

Between 2010 and 2017, the number of 501(c)(4) organizations dropped from almost 140,000 to fewer than 82,000. In 2017 revocations of 501(c)(4) groups comprised 58% which usually is only 15% of the total nonprofits which have their tax status revoked by the IRS for their failure to file Form 990.

== 501(c)(5) ==
A 501(c)(5) organization is a labor organization, an agricultural organization, or a horticultural organization. Labor unions, county fairs, and flower societies are examples of these types of groups. Labor union organizations were a primary benefactor of this organization type, dating to the 19th century. According to the Internal Revenue Service, a 501(c)(5) organization has a duty of providing service to its members first. The organization's benefits may not inure to a specific member, but the rules for inurement vary among the three different types of organizations under this segment. A 501(c)(5) organization can make unlimited corporate, individual, or union contributions.

A labor organization may pay benefits to its members because paying benefits improves all members' shared working conditions. An agricultural organization can provide financial assistance to its members in order to improve the conditions of those engaged in agricultural pursuits generally. Members can benefit in incidental ways from the organization's exempt activities as long as the benefits are available to all persons.

=== History ===
The first exemption for labor organizations from corporate income tax was enacted as part of the Payne–Aldrich Tariff Act of 1909.

The Revenue Act of 1913 excluded "labor, agricultural, or horticultural organizations" from income tax liability.

=== Contributions and activities ===
Much like 501(c)(4) and 501(c)(6) organizations, 501(c)(5) organizations may also perform some political activities. 501(c)(5) organizations are allowed to attempt to influence legislation that is related to the common union interests of its members.

501(c)(5) organizations can receive unlimited contributions from corporations, individuals, and labor unions. The names and addresses of contributors are not required to be made available for public inspection. All other information, including the amount of contributions, the description of noncash contributions, and any other information, is required to be made available for public inspection unless it clearly identifies the contributor.

A union membership dues paid to a 501(c)(5) organization are generally an ordinary and necessary business expense. The membership dues are tax-deductible in full unless a substantial part of the 501(c)(5) organization's activities consists of political activity, in which case a tax deduction is allowed only for the portion of membership dues that are for other activities.

Because associations involved in fishing and seafood harvesting were having difficulties qualifying for reduced postal rates, in 1976 Congress established Internal Revenue Code Section 501(5) to define "agriculture" as the art or science of cultivating land, harvesting crops or aquatic resources, or raising livestock.

Every organization, including a 501(c)(5) organization, that expressly advocates for the election or defeat of a particular political candidate and spends more than $250 during a calendar year must disclose the name of each person who contributed more than $200 during the calendar year to the Federal Election Commission. The Federal Election Commission is required to enforce this provision based on a federal court decision in 2018.

== 501(c)(6) ==
A 501(c)(6) organization is a business league, a chamber of commerce like the U.S. Chamber of Commerce, a real estate board, a board of trade, a professional football league or an organization like the Edison Electric Institute and the Security Industry Association, that are not organized for profit and no part of the net earnings goes to the benefit of any private shareholder or individual.

=== Qualifications for exemption ===
A business league may qualify if it is an association of persons having a common business interest, whose purpose is to promote the common business interest and whose activities improve business conditions rather than actually conduct the business itself. Members of the organization must be of the same trade, business, occupation, or profession in order to qualify. A local chamber of commerce or board of trade could qualify for similar reasons except that they may promote the common economic interests of all the commercial enterprises in a given trade or community.

In order to qualify for a tax-exemption under section 501(c)(6), the organization must specify that it seeks to promote and improve business condition for a specific type of business. Improving business conditions for all types of businesses is not generally qualifying. Similarly, providing a service for a specific type of business is also not typically qualifying, as that would usually be more of a commercial enterprise. For example, the service of managing health insurance plans for its member businesses is often a commercial enterprise if it is not substantially related to improving the business conditions for specific lines of businesses.

An association that promotes the common interests of certain hobbyists would not qualify because the Internal Revenue Service does not consider hobbies to be activities conducted as businesses.

An organization whose primary activity is advertising the products or services of its members does not qualify because the organization is performing a service for its members rather than promoting common interests. If an organization's primary activity is advertising the products or services of its members' industry as a whole, however, the organization will generally qualify if it also performs other services for its members.

=== Contributions and activities ===
Much like 501(c)(4) and 501(c)(5) organizations, 501(c)(6) organizations may also perform some political activities. 501(c)(6) organizations are allowed to attempt to influence legislation that is related to the common business interests of its members.

A 501(c)(6) organization may receive unlimited contributions from corporations, individuals, and labor unions. The names and addresses of contributors are not required to be made available for public inspection, with the exception of a 501(c)(6) organization that makes independent expenditures. All other information, including the amount of contributions, the description of non-cash contributions, and any other information, is required to be made available for public inspection unless it clearly identifies the contributor. The U.S. Chamber of Commerce is a large political spender, and Freedom Partners used its status as a 501(c)(6) organization to raise and distribute over $250 million during the 2012 election campaigns without disclosing its donors. The group's existence was not publicly known until nearly a year after the election.

A business's membership dues paid to a 501(c)(6) organization are generally an ordinary and necessary business expense. The membership dues are tax-deductible in full unless a substantial part of the 501(c)(6) organization's activities consists of political activity, in which case a tax deduction is allowed only for the portion of membership dues that are for other activities.

Every organization, including a 501(c)(6) organization, that expressly advocates for the election or defeat of a particular political candidate and spends more than $250 during a calendar year must disclose the name of each person who contributed more than $200 during the calendar year to the Federal Election Commission. The Federal Election Commission is required to enforce this provision based on a federal court decision in 2018.

=== History ===
The predecessor of IRC 501(c)(6) was enacted as part of the Revenue Act of 1913 likely due to a U.S. Chamber of Commerce request for an exemption for nonprofit "civic" and "commercial" organizations, which resulted in IRC 501(c)(4) for nonprofit "civic" organizations and IRC 501(c)(6) for nonprofit "commercially-oriented" organizations. The Revenue Act of 1928 amended the statute to include real estate boards. In 1966, professional football leagues were added to the described organizations.

The Revenue Act of 1913 related to professional football leagues had both antitrust and tax provisions: The antitrust provision was enacted to permit the merger of the National and American Football Leagues to go forward without fear of an antitrust challenge under either the 1914 Clayton Antitrust Act or the 1914 Federal Trade Commission Act. IRC 501(c)(6) amendment was enacted in 1966 to ensure that a professional football league's exemption would not be jeopardized because it administered a players' pension fund. Additionally, a professional sports league's exemption is not to be jeopardized because its primary source of revenue is the sale of television broadcasting rights to its games because the broadcasting of games increases public awareness of the sport.

In 2013, Senator Tom Coburn introduced legislation to disallow a tax exemption for the National Football League, the Professional Golfers' Association of America, and other professional sports organizations. Coburn estimated the tax exemption cost $100 million, but he said he could not get other members of Congress to support the legislation.

== 501(c)(7) ==
A 501(c)(7) organization is a social or recreational club that is organized for pleasure, recreation, and other nonprofitable purposes. Members must share interests and have a common goal directed toward pleasure and recreation, and the organization must provide opportunities for personal contact among members. The organization's facilities and services must be open to its members and their guests only. The organization must be a club of individuals, and no individual may derive profit from the organization's net earnings. Examples include college alumni associations; college fraternities or college sororities operating chapter houses for students; country clubs; amateur sport clubs; supper clubs that provide a meeting place, library, and dining room for members; hobby clubs; and garden clubs.

=== Activities ===
A substantial amount of the 501(c)(7) organization's activities must be related to social and recreational activities for its members. No more than 35 percent of its gross receipts may derive from non-members, and no more than 15 percent of its gross receipts is permitted to come from use of its facilities or services by the general public. An organization that exceeds these limits may lose its 501(c)(7) status.

When a group of eight or fewer individuals, at least one of whom is a member, uses the organization's facilities and the member pays for the other individuals, the Internal Revenue Service will assume the nonmembers are the guests of the member, and the revenue is deemed to be derived from the member. Similarly, if at least 75 percent of a group using club facilities are members of the organization, the Internal Revenue Service will assume the nonmembers are the guests of the member, and the revenue is deemed to be derived from the member. It is the responsibility of the organization to maintain these records. If the organization does not keep sufficient records to link revenue to a member, the Internal Revenue Service assumes the revenue came from a nonmember.

The organization is subject to Unrelated Business Income Tax for the revenue derived from nonmember use of its facilities and services, less allowable deductions. If the organization sells assets that were previously used for recreational or social purposes, the proceeds are considered related business income as long as the proceeds are reinvested in the organization. Public use of the organization's facilities must be minimal, generally either less than $2,500 per year or less than five percent of its total gross receipts from normal and usual activities of the club.

A 501(c)(7) organization cannot have a written policy of discriminating on the basis of race, color, or religion. Nevertheless, a 501(c)(7) organization is permitted to limit its members to a particular religion in order to further the teachings of that religion. An auxiliary of a 501(c)(8) fraternal benefit society that limits membership to members of a particular religion is allowed to do so as well. Having written policies that limit its membership by ethnic origin and gender would not jeopardize the organization's tax-exempt status.

=== History ===
The predecessor of Internal Revenue Code Section 501(c)(7) was part of the Revenue Act of 1913, which provides a tax-exemption to "fraternal beneficiary societies, orders, or associations operating under the lodge system or for the exclusive benefit of the members of a fraternity itself operating under the lodge system". Congress justified the tax-exemption with the reasoning that the members join to provide themselves with recreational or social organization without further tax consequences, similar as if they had paid for the benefits directly. Tax-exemption was available for organizations operated exclusively for pleasure, recreation, and other nonprofitable purposes.

In 1969, Congress passed a law stating that social and recreational clubs were permitted to engage in some unrelated business income, subject to income tax.

== 501(c)(8) ==
A 501(c)(8) organization is a fraternal benefit society.

=== Eligibility ===
The society must have members of a similar calling, recreation, or profession, or members who work together to accomplish a worthy goal. The members have associated themselves in order to help each other and to promote the common cause. The society must have written documentation of its eligibility standards for membership, classes of membership, a process of admission, and rights and privileges of members.

The members must have a common bond, which may be based on religious beliefs, gender, occupation, ethnicity, or shared values.

The society must have a supreme governing body and subordinate lodges into which members are elected, initiated, or admitted in accordance with its laws. The supreme governing body should be composed of delegates elected directly by members or intermediate assemblies.

The society must offer benefits to members, which may include life insurance, medical insurance, scholarships, educational programs, travel opportunities, and discount programs. Revenue generated from providing benefits to non-members must be insubstantial to the society and may be taxable as unrelated business income.

=== Donations ===
An individual's donation to a fraternity is only a tax-deductible charitable contribution if the contribution "is to be used exclusively for religious, charitable, scientific, literary, or educational purposes, or for the prevention of cruelty to children or animals."

=== History ===
Fraternal benefit societies trace their lineage back through mutual benefit societies, friendly societies and eventually to medieval guilds. Many fraternal benefit societies were founded to serve the needs of immigrants and other under-served groups who shared common bonds of religion, ethnicity, gender, occupation or shared values.

Section 38 of the Payne–Aldrich Tariff Act of 1909 was the first law to provide a tax-exemption for fraternal beneficiary societies. The tax-exemption was later codified as section 501(c)(8) with the Internal Revenue Code of 1954.

=== Relationship to 501(c)(10) ===
Similar to 501(c)(8) organizations, 501(c)(10) organizations are also fraternal societies, orders, or associations operating under the lodge system, but 501(c)(10) organizations do not offer life, sick, accident, or other benefits. 501(c)(10) organizations devote net earnings exclusively to religious, charitable, scientific, literary, educational, and fraternal purposes.

== 501(c)(13) ==
A 501(c)(13) organization is a certain type of cemetery company.

=== Eligibility ===
There are two primary types of eligible cemetery companies. A mutual cemetery company must be either "owned by and operated exclusively for the benefit of its lot owners who hold such lots for bona fide burial purposes and not for the purpose of resale" or engages in the burial of impoverished people performing similar charitable activities. A nonprofit cemetery corporation must be incorporated solely for the purpose of the burial or the cremation of bodies and no part of its net earnings inures to the benefit of any private shareholder or individual. Any net gain by the cemetery must be devoted to certain cemetery functions, such as the cemetery's operations, maintenance, and improvements; acquisition of cemetery property; and investment of the net gain in order to provide additional income for cemetery functions. Net gains are not allowed to be distributed to individuals.

The cemetery may restrict burials and cremations to a certain group of people, such as impoverished people, people adherent to a certain religion, or people who lived in a certain community, as long as it still serves a broad class of people and operates for public purposes, but a 501(c)(13) organization may not enforce overly restrictive restrictions.

A perpetual care fund that is used by a profit-making cemetery to maintain cemetery properties and burial lots is not eligible under 501(c)(13). On the other hand, a nonprofit organization may have a perpetual care fund without jeopardizing its exemption under Section 501(c)(13).

A cemetery that owns or operates a morgue, whether on its own grounds or elsewhere, is not eligible under 501(c)(13) because the Internal Revenue Service does not consider mortuary services necessarily incident to burial purposes. The provision of traditional burial services that directly support and maintain basic tenets and beliefs of a religion regarding burial of its members" may still be eligible under 501(c)(13).

A cemetery that buries animals is not eligible under 501(c)(13).

A cemetery company wishing to be recognized under Section 501(c)(13) needs to prepare and file Form 1024 with the Internal Revenue Service.

=== Charitable contributions ===
Charitable contributions to a 501(c)(13) organization are tax-deductible to the donor. Payments for perpetual care of a particular lot or a particular crypt are not considered tax-deductible charitable contributions. Payments made as part of the purchase price of a burial lot or crypt are not considered tax-deductible charitable contributions, even if a portion of the payment is for the perpetual care of the entirety of the cemetery. Bequests or gifts to a 501(c)(13) cemetery are not deductible for federal estate tax purposes or gift tax purposes.

=== History ===
Historically, cemeteries were exempt from local property taxes and excise taxes in most states because states generally considered cemeteries to be performing a recognized civic service.

The Tariff Act of 1913 provided an exemption from federal income taxes for mutual cemetery companies that were organized and operated exclusively "for the benefit of their members". In 1921, Congress extended the tax-exemption to cemetery companies that are not mutual and to cemetery companies that are not operated for profit as well as any corporation solely incorporated to operate a cemetery and whose net gains do not inure to any person.

In 1970, Congress added crematorium in the definition of cemetery for the purposes of Section 501(c)(13).

== See also ==
- 527 organization
- Political action committee
- Not-for-profit arts organization
- Buckley v. Valeo, which removed limits on spending on political speech

=== Other tax-exempt organizations ===
- 501(d) – Religious or apostolic organizations with the purpose of operating a religious community where the members live a communal life following the tenets and teachings of the organization. The organization's property is owned by each of the individuals in the community but, upon leaving, a member cannot withdraw any of the community's assets. The organization's income goes into a community treasury that is used to pay for the organization's operating expenses and supporting members and their families.
- 501(e) – Cooperative hospital service organizations that are organized to provide services for multiple tax-exempt hospitals.
- 501(f) – Cooperative service organizations of educational organizations that invest assets contributed by each of the organization's members.
- 501(j) – Amateur sports organizations that either conduct national or international sporting competitions or develop amateur athletes for national or international sporting competitions.
- 501(k) – Day care centers may qualify as tax-exempt under Section 501(k). The day care center must provide child care away from their homes. At least 85 percent of the children served must be cared for while their parent or guardian is either employed, seeking employment, or a full-time student. Most of the day care center's funding must come from fees received for day care services. The day care center must also provide child care services to the general public. The tax exemption for certain day care centers was part of the Deficit Reduction Act of 1984.
- 501(n) – Charitable risk pools that pool insurable risks of its members, which are tax-exempt charities.
- 521(a) – Farmers' cooperative associations that market its member farmers' products at market rates, make purchases at wholesale rates, and remit earnings to member farmers.
- 527 – Political organizations that operate primarily to raise or spend money to influence the selection, nomination, election, or appointment of any individual to any Federal, State, or local public office, such as political parties, political action committees, and Super PACs.
- 528 – Homeowner associations, condominium management associations, residential real estate management associations, and timeshare associations may elect to be exempt from income tax on their exempt-function income under Section 528. Alternatively, some homeowner associations may qualify under Section 501(c)(4) instead. A homeowner association that provides only social and recreational activities may qualify under Section 501(c)(7).
- 529 – Qualified tuition plans operated by a state or educational institution.
- 4947(a)(1) – Non-exempt charitable trusts that have exclusively charitable interests.
- 4947(a)(2) – Split-interest trusts.
- 115(1) – Entities that derived their income a public utility or the exercise of any essential governmental function and accruing to a state or municipality.
- 115(2) – States and municipalities.
- 892(a) – Foreign governments.
- 892(b) – Public international organizations or international-organization preparatory commissions in which the Government of the United States participates.
