= Stand by Your Ad provision =

United States federal election legislation

The "Stand By Your Ad" provision (SBYA) of the Bipartisan Campaign Reform Act (BCRA, also known as the McCain–Feingold Act), enacted in 2002, requires candidates in the United States for federal political office, as well as interest groups and political parties supporting or opposing a candidate, to include in political advertisements on television and radio "a statement by the candidate that identifies the candidate and states that the candidate has approved the communication." The provision was intended to force political candidates running any campaign for office in the United States to associate themselves with their television and radio advertising, thereby discouraging them from making controversial claims or attack ads.

In American politics, "I approve this message" (sometimes in the past tense, also with "authorize" in place of "approve" or with "ad" instead of "message") is a phrase said by candidates for federal office to comply with this provision.

The DISCLOSE Act, proposed by Democrats in a response to the Supreme Court decision in Citizens United v. Federal Election Commission (which held that corporations and labor unions have a constitutional right to spend unlimited sums of money on advocacy ads), would have required the heads of non-campaign organizations funding political advertisements (such as "super PACs" or corporations) to appear on-camera and follow the "stand by your ad" requirement. Although the bill passed the House of Representatives, it failed in the Senate and did not become law.

== Purpose and origins ==
Attack ads that criticize an opponent's political platform quickly rose to popularity in United States since the 1960s. In more recent times these ads became increasingly Ad hominem attacks, some of them appearing to be anonymous, that discouraged voters. Proponents of the Stand By Your Ad provision, such as Senator Ron Wyden (D-Oregon) who sponsored the provision in the BCRA, advocate that by forcing candidates to associate themselves with their attacks in the ads, voters would be more inclined to punish them for using such a strategy, thus discouraging candidates from campaigning in such a manner.

The earliest roots of the provision can be traced to the 1996 Senate election in Minnesota, where a grassroots movement known as "Minnesota Compact" attempted to combat negative campaigning that was rampant in the state, though what was proposed remained voluntary.

In 1999, the "Stand By Your Ad" provision was brought up again, this time in the 1999 North Carolina General Assembly. The "Campaign Reform Act" S.881 was ratified and signed into state law on July 21, 1999. This required candidates and their campaign committees to

include a disclosure statement spoken by the candidate and containing at least the following words: 'I am (or "This is...") [name of candidate], candidate for [name of office], and I (or "my campaign...") sponsored this ad.' This subdivision applies only to an advertisement that mentions the name of, shows the picture of, transmits the voice of, or otherwise refers to an opposing candidate for the same office as the sponsoring candidate.

Following the perceived success of the "Stand By Your Ad" provision in North Carolina state law in reducing negative campaigning, similar measures were introduced into other state legislatures. Two years later, a bill was introduced in Congress to extend this provision to federal law. It was eventually absorbed into the BCRA, which addressed the issue of financing of political campaigns, that was signed into law by George W. Bush on March 27, 2002.

== Implementation ==
Under Section 311 of the BCRA, Section 318 the Federal Election Campaign Act of 1971 (2 U.S.C. 441d) was amended to include the "Stand By Your Ad" provision. Representative David Price of North Carolina proposed the amendment, modeling after the North Carolina law. Price stated that "The American people are sick of the relentlessly negative tone of campaigns, particularly in presidential races. "Stand by your ad" isn't just about restoring civility to campaigns. It's also about restoring people's faith in our political process."

The most prominent effect was on television ads, which now required candidates to include in any campaign ad the candidate or the candidate's campaign runs

a statement that identifies the candidate and states that the candidate has approved the communication. Such statement--

(I) shall be conveyed by--

(I) an unobscured, full-screen view of the candidate making the statement, or
(II) the candidate in voice-over, accompanied by a clearly identifiable photographic or similar image of the candidate; and

(II) shall also appear in writing at the end of the communication in a clearly readable manner with a reasonable degree of color contrast between the background and the printed statement, for a period of at least 4 seconds.

The phrase can be said at any point during the ad, but is typically inserted at the beginning or the end. The provision also covers radio advertising, in which the voice of the candidate approving the communication is required.

If the advertisement is not in English, the phrase is given in the same language; in the 2004 presidential election for example, George W. Bush's Spanish-language advertisements ended with the message "Soy George W. Bush y aprobé este mensaje".

Failure to comply may result in penalties from the Federal Election Commission, but more importantly, loss of the "lowest rate" status for political ads, for the entire duration of the campaign. However, this rule is enforced at the discretion of the station manager, and often only through legal action by the opposing candidate. For example, in the 2008 Minnesota senate election, challenger Al Franken accused Senator Norm Coleman of omitting 1.1 seconds of the required visual of the candidate, a mistake that could potentially double the advertising rates and costs millions to Coleman's campaign. Including Coleman at the same duration of campaigning, Republicans in four Senate state races were subject to investigation by the Federal Election Commission and Federal Communications Commission for allegedly short-changing on "Stand By Your Ad" disclaimer.

== Online advertising ==
The "Stand By Your Ad" requirements do not cover any form of advertising over the Internet. Campaigns now regard the Internet a medium that is as important as television, radio and print advertising, or perhaps even more important due to its cost-effectiveness and rate of propagation.

Candidates have been known to take the mudslinging online, hoping that it would create sufficient controversy that media outlets would afford the coverage it needed without associating themselves to the attack. During the 2004 presidential election for instance, George W. Bush's campaign produced a web video with the conclusion "Kerry (D-MA) – Brought to you by the special interests" and sent it out to six million supporters via email. Another known tactic is for any campaign or person to upload an exclusive online attack ad, known or anonymously, on a video-sharing website such as YouTube without taking any credit for it. This was highlighted by the media after an anonymous editor uploaded a parody 1984 ad depicting Senator Hillary Clinton (D-NY) as "Big Brother" during the 2008 Democratic primaries, which garnered over five million views online.

Wyden has since proposed to extend the requirement to political advertising on the Internet. The sequel "Stand By Your Internet Ad Act" was introduced into the United States Congress on April 12, 2005, but has received little momentum since. This bipartisan effort by Senators Wyden (D-Oregon) and Lindsey Graham (R-South Carolina) would apply the existing rules to include additional electioneering strategies like print ads and internet ads, in an effort to deter candidates from inflammatory campaign communications.

In March 2023, a final rule was put in place by the FEC that provided more clarity around the concept of public communications, in an effort to better apply regulatory standards upon online and digital political ads which have largely been unaddressed; in so doing, the FEC's attention on internet advertisements has brought about a new definition: "communications placed for a fee on another person's website, digital device, application, or advertising platform,” that can withstand technological advances to come.

== Reception ==
Howard Dean, who ran for the 2004 Democratic nomination, took some unwarranted attacks from people who were not aware of the act, who thought he was being self-important or obvious in the phrasing. While opponents of the provision at its time of introduction lodged challenges in court that it would violate the First Amendment, others believed that the law merely stiffened disclaimer guidelines and had no effect on limiting free speech. One example is the McConnell v. FEC decision, which upheld the Stand By Your Ad provision as being constitutional, yet dissenting concerns remain about the threat posed to anonymity due to the regulatory mandate that calls for TV and radio ads to publicly disclose their sponsors.

Campaigns have lamented that the seconds used for the candidates to approve the communication results in less time for them to communicate their message, increasing their costs of campaigning. One media adviser mentioned that the requirement reduced the number of positive spots that the producer can have. Other candidates, however, regard it as an opportunity to affirm or encapsulate the theme of their message: "I'm Tom Kean, Jr. Together, we can break the back of corruption. That's why I approved this message."

A study by Brigham Young University, however, revealed that advertisements where the candidate has approved the communication had a more positive impact in comparison to those that did not, regardless of whether they knew the candidates well. It also concluded that the provision made viewers have more confidence that the political campaigns were run in a truthful and fair manner.

== Use outside campaign advertising ==
Although rarely noted by pundits during the course of congressional debate, the provision became one of the most recognized—and joked about—changes in the content of television ads.

Several politicians have made references to the phrase in aspects of their campaign outside radio or television advertising. In the 2006 elections, Senator Joseph Lieberman declared "I approve this election" in his acceptance speech, following his victory as a third-party candidate (Connecticut for Lieberman). Just before the 2008 Democratic National Convention, Hillary Clinton made news by announcing that "she did not approve this message" in reference to the John McCain campaign using clips of her attacking Barack Obama during the Democratic primaries.
