= Harold M. Ickes =

American lawyer

Harold Ickes
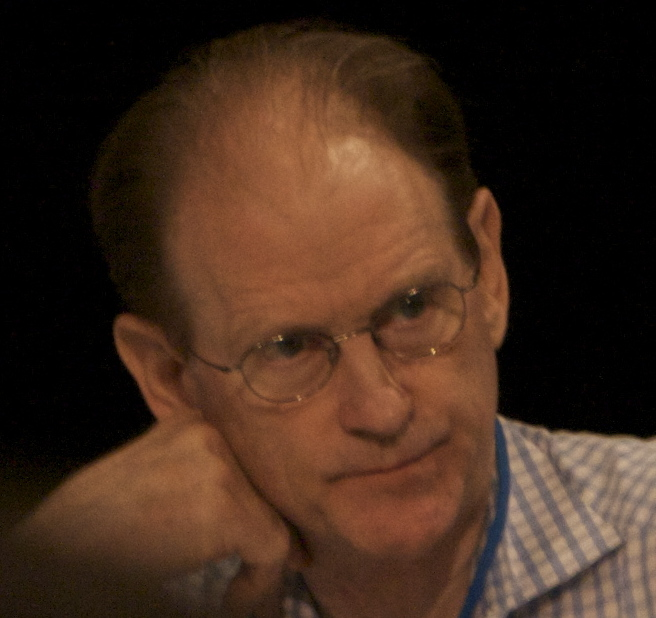

White House Deputy Chief of Staff for Policy
- In office December 22, 1993 – January 20, 1997
- President: Bill Clinton
- Preceded by: Roy Neel
- Succeeded by: Sylvia Mathews Burwell

Personal details
- Born: Harold McEwen Ickes; September 4, 1939 (age 87) Baltimore, Maryland, U.S.
- Party: Democratic
- Spouse: Laura Handman
- Relatives: Harold L. Ickes (father)
- Education: Stanford University (BA); Columbia University (JD)

Harold McEwen Ickes (/ˈɪkiːz/ IK-eez; born September 4, 1939) is the former White House Deputy Chief of Staff for President Bill Clinton. He was a leading figure in the Clinton administration's healthcare reform initiative.

Ickes is the son of Harold L. Ickes, who was Secretary of the Interior under Franklin D. Roosevelt.

== Background ==
Ickes was born in Baltimore, Maryland, to Harold L. Ickes and Jane Dahlman.

Ickes is a graduate of Stanford University (1964, AB, economics) and Columbia Law School. Ickes was a student civil rights activist in the 1960s and took part in Freedom Summer. He has practiced labor law for many years in New York City. He is founder and president emeritus of civic data firm Catalist.

He was the model for the Primary Colors character "Howard Ferguson".

== Career ==
Ickes worked on the presidential campaigns of Eugene McCarthy, Birch Bayh, Morris Udall, Ted Kennedy, and Jesse Jackson. In 1989, he was a senior advisor to David Dinkins's successful campaign for mayor of New York City. Ickes is a registered lobbyist with the Ickes and Enright Group, a subsidiary of the Tiber Creek Group, a government relations firm in Washington, D.C.

Ickes is co-chair of Meyer, Suozzi, English & Klein, P.C.'s Labor and Government Relations practice groups, and manages the firm's Washington, D.C., office.

At Tiber Creek Group, a government relations firm in Washington D.C., Ickes provides counsel and representation to business and union clients on legislative, governmental regulation, and procurement matters.

Along with Basil Paterson, Ickes co-chairs the firm's labor practice, providing counsel to local and international unions.

In 2005, Ickes founded progressive data collection and voter file company Catalist. As of 2019, he serves on the board of directors of Catalist and as its president emeritus.

Martindale-Hubbell had given Ickes an "AV Preeminent" rating, which is the highest level of professional excellence among lawyers. When he became the political strategist for Hillary Clinton's Democratic presidential nomination campaign in February 2008, Ickes was featured in a prominent article in the New York Times, detailing his approach to this political campaign and his "sassy" and "dyspeptic" demeanor.

In November 2009, Ickes joined New York Governor David Paterson's election campaign as a senior adviser.

=== Clinton administration ===
Ickes chaired Bill Clinton's presidential campaign in New York in 1992, persuading state Democrats to stand by Clinton despite the controversy over Gennifer Flowers.

In the Clinton administration, Ickes served as Deputy Chief of Staff under Leon Panetta. In a lengthy New York Times profile of Ickes in 1997, Michael Lewis nicknamed Ickes "the Garbage Man" and noted that 'Ickes has been caught up in so many of Clinton's scandals and crises that he came to describe his function in the White House as 'director of the sanitation department'.' When Erskine Bowles was appointed Chief of Staff after Clinton's 1996 re-election, he requested to have input in choosing his subordinates, and so Ickes was dismissed from his position. It has also been suggested that Ickes resigned to take the fall for President Clinton, as Republican Senator Fred Thompson had the Senate Governmental Affairs Committee probe Clinton's campaign finances.

In 2000, he was a senior advisor to Hillary Clinton's Senate campaign. He now heads the Media Fund, a 527 committee. Following the 2004 elections, he was a contender against Howard Dean for the chairmanship of the Democratic National Committee (DNC).

Ickes worked as a political strategist for Hillary Clinton's failed campaign in the 2008 presidential election. Ickes reportedly had a poor relationship with campaign strategist Mark Penn. This acrimony carried over from their days in President Bill Clinton's administration.

=== DNC rules and bylaws committee ===
As a member of the DNC's Rules Committee he was a proponent of adding other states besides Iowa and New Hampshire early on in the Presidential nominating calendar. He was unsuccessful in his promotion of Alabama as the second primary state, after New Hampshire, which lost to South Carolina. With all but one member of the Rules and Bylaws Commission, Ickes voted in August 2007 to strip Florida and Michigan of their delegates. Clinton won the vote in Florida after neither candidate campaigned there and voters were told that their vote would not count, in accordance with the earlier decision.

At a contentious meeting of the DNC Rules & Bylaws Committee held at the Marriott Wardman Park Hotel in Washington, DC, on May 31, 2008, Ickes voted in favor of a compromise resolution to allow the Florida delegation to be seated with each delegate having one half vote giving presidential candidate Sen. Hillary Clinton (NY) 105 pledged delegates (52.5 votes), candidate Sen. Barack Obama (IL) 67 delegates (33.5 votes), and former Sen. John Edwards (NC) 13 delegates (6.5 votes); and against a resolution proposed by the Michigan Democratic Party to seat the Michigan delegation with 69 delegates (34.5 votes) pledged to Sen. Clinton and 59 delegates (29.5 votes) for Sen. Obama (IL) at the Democratic National Convention in Denver, CO, in August, 2008. (The net result was a gain of 87 delegate votes for Clinton and 63 for Obama.) In the interest of "unifying our Party" the Florida resolution was approved by a unanimous vote of 27–0, while the more controversial Michigan resolution passed by a vote of 19 to 8. The resolutions also provided that the delegates from both states should be slated under Rules 5, 6, 7, and 12, which outline the candidate's right of approval.

"This motion will hijack – hijack – remove four delegates won by Hillary Clinton," Ickes said in opposing the Michigan motion. "This body of 30 individuals has decided that they're going to substitute their judgment for 600,000 [Michigan] voters." Immediately prior to the vote on the motion, Ickes announced that candidate Clinton would reserve the right to appeal the Rules Committee's approval of the Michigan resolution to the DNC Credentials Committee. The option of appeal and a convention fight was rendered moot, as Clinton suspended her campaign and endorsed Obama on June 7.
