= Ballot Initiative Strategy Center =

American advocacy organization

- Formation: 1999
- Headquarters: Washington, DC
- Region served: United States
- Executive Director: Chris Melody Fields Figueredo
- Website: ballot.org

The Ballot Initiative Strategy Center (BISC) is a liberal American advocacy organization which tries to motivate voters to go to the polls through the strategic deployment of liberal-oriented ballot initiatives. The group provides legal advice and political expertise for left-leaning ballot measure campaigns.

== Organization ==
BISC was founded in 1999. In 2007, BISC moved into an office on K Street.

== Focus ==
In 2016, the group's executive director said it was focusing on issues related to economic fairness, such as minimum wage measures. Targeted states and campaigns were not specified.

== Funding ==
BISC does not publicly disclose its donors. The group has received financial support from billionaire George Soros and his Open Society Institute, NARAL Pro-Choice America, the Ford Foundation, and the National Education Association. BISC is a member of America Votes, a 501(c)(4) organization that aims "to coordinate and promote progressive issues."
