= BISC (database) =

Content
- Description: Protein–protein interaction database linking structural biology with functional genomics
- Data types captured: Protein structure and Protein-protein interactions

Contact
- Research center: University of Edinburgh
- Primary citation: PMID 21081561
- Release date: 2010

Access
- Website: http://bisc.cse.ucsc.edu

Binary subcomplexes in proteins database (BISC) is a protein–protein interaction database about binary subcomplexes.
