= Issue advocacy ads =

'Issue advocacy ads, also called interest advocacy ads or issue-only ads, are communications that raise public awareness of a social or political issue. They are sponsored by advocacy groups, including issue advocacy groups and special interest groups. In the United States, the term is used mainly in campaign finance law, where issue advocacy is distinguished from express advocacy, which explicitly calls for the election or defeat of a candidate. Because the two have been regulated differently, some groups have run ads that praised or criticized candidates while leaving out explicit voting appeals, and then described them as issue advocacy.

The boundary between the two has been shaped by the Bipartisan Campaign Reform Act of 2002 and by several Supreme Court decisions, including Buckley v. Valeo (1976), McConnell v. Federal Election Commission (2003), Federal Election Commission v. Wisconsin Right to Life, Inc. (2007) and Citizens United v. Federal Election Commission (2010).

== Interest versus express advocacy ==
The bright-line test doesn't cover forms of communication that are indirect or debatable. Consider this message to voters:

- If you like candidate X, you need to know he did Y.

In a communication like this, there is no mention about voting, however, the plain intention is to cast doubt on voters that supported candidate X.

Campaigning like this is typically called negative campaigning, making attack ads, or making thinly veiled promotional ads on the behalf of the candidate.

=== Interest advocacy ===
Interest advocacy is the act of making generalized communication regarding a public issue or problem without advocating voters to take a specific action at the election booth.

Identification of a pure "issue only ads" made by interest advocacy groups is difficult. Groups that sponsored messages needed to make it clear, to a voter with reasonable intelligence, that the voter should cast their ballot in a manner the group wanted.

Keeping an advertisement issue important to only groups like 501(c)(3) non-profits. They were subject to limits or absolute prohibitions on engaging in political activities. Organizations can participate in nonpartisan voter education efforts, including registration and "get-out-the-vote" drives and issue advocacy.

=== Express advocacy ===
Express advocacy is largely used in connection with a debate in the US regarding when issue advocacy turns into campaigning.

Many groups that made what appeared to most to be campaign advertisements claimed that their communications to voters were really issue advocacy and not express advocacy. To help understand the difference, examine these two communications to voters:

- Select John Smith.
- Vote no! on Proposition 99.

In both examples the message's intention is clear. Using a standard that looks for specific words or phrases in a communication is called conducting a bright-line test. Bright-line is a standard if there is no mistake. One or more of the "Eight Magic Words" is present or not present..

Express advocacy is associated with independent expenditures.

=== History ===
In the 1970s, changes to regulations permitted non-candidate organizations to make independent expenditures and use their money in election season. They could neither give it directly to a candidate nor make advertisement on a candidates behalf. Typical expenditures were described as being "party building" and get out the vote campaigns. Organizations, especially non-profits were supposed to do it on a nonpartisan basis. However, groups tended to focus efforts on signing up and getting the type of voters to the polls that were most likely to hold similar views.

The only barrier stopping a group from campaigning directly for their favorite candidate or cause was something called the "reasonable person" test: if a reasonable person, viewing the communication, comes to the conclusion the sponsor wants them to vote in one way, it is express advocacy, not interest advocacy.

==== Eight magic words ====
One problem with the reasonable person test is it is not definitive or a bright-line rule. There was no clear line that clearly stated if you cross this point you are on the wrong side. In Buckley v. Valeo, decided in January 1976, the United States Supreme Court limited the reach of campaign finance laws to candidate and party committees, and other committees with a major purpose of electing candidates, or to speech that "expressly advocated" election or defeat of candidates. In footnote 52 of that opinion, the Court listed eight words or phrases as illustrative of speech that qualified as "express advocacy".A footnote was included in a US Supreme Court ruling providing eight examples.

Under the Buckley ruling, speakers that did not invoke any of the eight specific words and phrases of Buckley, or similar language expressly calling voters to vote for or against a candidate, were exempt from campaign finance laws.

The eight words and phrases appearing in Buckley were

- "vote for"
- "elect"
- "support"
- "cast your ballot for"
- "Smith for Congress"
- "vote against"
- "defeat"
- "reject"
- or any variations thereof.

That footnote was intended to provide examples of the types of things that would lead a reasonable person to conclude the speaker was advocating a particular candidate or ballot measure.

The Court felt that limiting campaign finance laws to speech with such express advocacy was necessary to avoid a "chilling effect" on speech about political officeholders and issues that was protected under the First Amendment to the Constitution.

As a hypothetical example, suppose someone placed an advertisement that went something like this:

John Smith is a decent man who earned his education in the field and stands up for worker rights. Mary Jones received her undergraduate degree at Yale, and a law degree at Northwestern. She advocates eating vegetables. How do you feel about that?

Although the ad might influence potential voters for or against one of the candidates, it does not specifically advocate action to elect a candidate for office. As such, it falls outside of laws that restrict political speech intended to influence elections.

These types of ads became known colloquially as "issue ads".

==== After 1976 ====
However, rather than using them as examples, many found it easier to just leave out the "magic words" and claim their communications to voters were fine. By 1996, interest advocacy groups were spending millions of dollars on campaigns claiming their advertisements were "issue only" since they left out the "magic words."

By 2000, voters were inundated with $500 million worth of this type of advertisement. Owing to the "shame issue ads," scandals, and the amount of spending, Congress held a congressional investigation. It reinvigorated campaign finance reform, and led to the Bipartisan Campaign Reform Act in 2002, which is more commonly known as McCain-Feingold.

In 2003, in McConnell v. Federal Election Commission, the Court detailed the difference between interest versus express advocacy. It ruled looking for "magic words" as "functionally meaningless" since an advertiser can communicate its intention to voters without them. Therefore, instead of looking for words, the Court again ruled that if a communication to voters had "no reasonable interpretation other than as an appeal to vote for, or against, a specific candidate," it is "the functional equivalent of express advocacy."

In the 2004 United States presidential election, "issue only" ads continued and some famous ones were made by a group called Swift Boat. They claimed their advertisements were issue only ads, not express advocacy. According to at least one analyst, voters voted exactly how the sponsors intended and the advertisements "torpedoed" Massachusetts Democrat John Kerry presidential campaign, 2004. Additionally, a political action committee Progress of America, ran an advertisement that showed the horrors of terrorism and stated that Osama bin Laden and Al-Qaeda want to kill American citizens. At the end, it asked, "Would you trust Kerry against these killers?" "George Bush did not start this War, but he will end it." The "magic words" are missing.

In 2007, the US Supreme Court in Federal Election Commission v. Wisconsin Right to Life, Inc. ruled that issue ads may not be banned from the months preceding a primary or general election. The test to tell the difference between interest and express advocacy remained the reasonable person test.

However, that is said to have created a difficulty. A test that requires someone to consider how a reasonable person views a communication to voters requires someone to decide. The only definitive answer comes from a judge and that takes time. Election commissions are not judges, but they can issue advisory opinion on the matter. That led to a concern that in federal elections, that officials at the Federal Election Commission and state-level commissions would have to do work. Anyone cautious, wanting to make sure the communication to voters, was interest and not express advocacy would contact it for an opinion. Communications to voters covers a wide range of areas including advertisements, e-mails, signs, and even speeches on the pulpit might want to ask someone.

To resolve this issue, the US Supreme Court looked back at a prior ruling. In 1976, in Buckley v. Valeo, the Supreme Court held that one thing of key importance was protecting free speech.

In 2010, Citizens United v. Federal Election Commission determined, among other things, that it would be basically not possible for the federal government to be in the business of determining what does and does not constitute issue advocacy or express advocacy.

== Disclosure requirements ==
In 2010, Citizens United "expressly rejected the contention that election-law disclosure requirements are limited to express advocacy or its functional equivalent." While it and a subsequent case affected certain spending limitations, it did not permit those making the spending from evading disclosure requirements by claiming they were performing issue advocacy.

Also in 2010 in a case known as Doe v. Reed, the Supreme Court rejected an appeal to keep signatures upon a referendum from voters, based upon a claim it violated the First Amendment.

Lower courts are already applying these new standards to uphold a gamut of state disclosure laws ranging from ballot measures to candidate elections, and from express advocacy to issue advocacy.

== See also ==
- Political action committee
- 527 Organization
- Citizens United v. Federal Election Commission (2010)
