= Steve Rosenthal =

American labor and political strategist

Steven P. Rosenthal
- Occupations: Labor and political strategist
- Known for: AFL-CIO political director; founder and CEO of America Coming Together

Steven "Steve" Rosenthal is an American labor and political strategist. He was the political director of the AFL-CIO for seven years.

== Biography ==
Rosenthal's father was a Brooklyn shoe salesman.

In 2003, Rosenthal was one of the founders and chief executive officer of America Coming Together (ACT), a voter mobilization project aimed at defeating incumbent Republican president George W. Bush in the 2004 presidential election. ACT raised and spent over $142 million and built one of the largest voter mobilization campaigns in Democratic history.

Rosenthal served for seven years as the political director of the AFL-CIO. He announced in August 2002 that he would be stepping down from his post after the November elections. At the time, The New York Times reported that many union leaders credited Rosenthal with "transforming organized labor's feeble, forgettable campaign operation into one that many political analysts say is the most effective in the nation."

Matt Bai in The New York Times described Rosenthal in 2005 as one of "the Democratic Party's smartest and most influential strategists."
