= Independent expenditure =

Type of political campaign communication in the US

An independent expenditure, in elections in the United States, is a political campaign communication that expressly advocates for the election or defeat of a clearly identified political candidate that is not made in cooperation, consultation or concert with – or at the request or suggestion of – a candidate, a candidate's authorized committee, or a political party. If a candidate's agent, authorized committee, party, or an "agent" for one of these groups becomes "materially involved", the expenditure is not independent.

== Definition ==
The Code of Federal Regulations defined independent expenditure as an expenditure for a communication "expressly advocating the election or defeat of a clearly identified candidate that is not made in cooperation, consultation, or concert with, or at the request or suggestion of, a candidate, a candidate's authorized committee, or their agents, or a political party or its agents." 11 CFR 100.16(a). The term was first introduced in the Code of Federal Regulations in 2003.

The Federal Election Commission defines an agent as someone who has "actual authority, either express or implied" to perform one or more of a list of actions on behalf of a campaign. It stipulates that an otherwise independent expenditure could be invalidated if an "agent" does something as simple as suggesting an advertisement be made. To prevent this, some groups claim that they sequester staff months before an election.

An organization making an independent expenditure must include a federally mandated disclaimer identifying the person or organization paying for the communication and stating that the communication was not authorized by a candidate or candidate's committee.

== As distinguished from contributions ==
Contributions are money, or their equivalent, that are given to someone to use. Candidates and groups then spend the money, or their equivalent, to pay for campaigns. The phrase "or their equivalent" is incorporated into definitions to account for other things of value. For example, a radio station that gives free air-time so a group can run an ad is making a contribution.

== Coordinations ==
=== Pre-candidacy strategies ===
In recent years, a number of candidates have sought to bypass campaign finance rules by delaying their intention to run for office, instead forming so-called "exploratory committees." Exploratory committees had been in existence well before the advent of super PACs, but are now increasingly used with the explicit intention of giving candidates a head-start in their respective campaigns. Ostensibly, they're created as a means to "test the waters" of that potential candidate's electability; in reality, and today more than ever, it enables them to raise money above what is set out in the federal candidate contribution limits and restrictions (which stipulates no more than $3,300 per individual donor, and no corporate/union funds) until they've officially declared their candidacy. This behavior has been challenged by legal analysts, most notably by the Senior Counsel at the Campaign Legal Center, Paul S. Ryan. He asserts that prior to the 2016 Presidential Primaries, "[Jeb] Bush, [Martin] O'Malley, [Rick] Santorum and [Scott] Walker [were] all raising funds above the $2,700 candidate limit, providing reason to believe they [were] violating federal law." Ryan argues, "[They] have actually crossed the threshold to become 'candidates' as defined in federal law, by referring to themselves publicly as candidates and/or by amassing campaign funds that will be spent after they formally declare their candidacies." Furthermore, by refraining from officially announcing their candidacies, they are essentially free to raise unlimited funds for their chosen super PAC, and both 'coordinate' with and guide that super PAC in any way they see fit. This allows potential candidates-to-be to drum-up support and publicity, as well as stockpiling funds for their nominated super PAC, well in advance of whichever campaign they're looking to contest.

=== Examples of alleged coordination ===
Some have argued that FEC regulations are regularly flouted through the use of loopholes, and that a significant amount of independent expenditure is, in reality, coordinated. A piece written by Alex Roarty and Shane Goldmacher in the National Journal, and republished in The Atlantic, outlined just how "brazen" current attempts at coordination can be. Focusing on Thom Tillis, a Republican US Senator from North Carolina, and his 2014 Senate campaign's efforts to influence his allied super PAC, it details the publication of a freely-available memo on Tillis's website, which outlined his campaign's detailed advertising strategy. Purportedly 'intended' for donors, "It is just as easily read as an explicit wish list aimed at the inboxes of outside allies with whom he cannot otherwise legally communicate about strategy." Paul S. Ryan from the Campaign Legal Center noted he had "never seen anything like it," but "hastened to add he also saw nothing illegal in the Tillis missive." As Roarty and Goldmacher elaborate, "The restrictions that bar coordination between candidates and their allies only apply to explicit communication between the two sides—a loophole that has been exploited by speaking in public ever since the proliferation of outside organizations following the Supreme Court's Citizens United ruling."

In 2015, Jeb Bush and his dealings with his Right to Rise super PAC faced significant scrutiny due to the perception of apparent coordination. Alice Ollstein, writing for thinkprogress.org, clarifies, "Buried in the most recent round of FEC filings is evidence Bush's Right to Rise super PAC paid the firm Wisecup Consulting LLC at least $16,000 this April and May for 'political strategy consulting,' while the campaign paid the same firm about $60,000 for exactly the same service — despite the two entities being legally barred from any coordination." Moreover, after suffering setbacks in the early primaries of his presidential campaign, Jeb Bush's Right to Rise super PAC produced a television advert using his brother, former President George W. Bush, to endorse him. When queried about the commercial, Jeb Bush protested that "[He] didn't know [his brother] was doing that" and was "righteous in making sure there's no coordination." Given the nature of their relationship, some have found it difficult to believe that Jeb Bush had no role or influence in recruiting his brother to make the ad, and thus, contravened campaign finance coordination rules.

Some have advocated for a rethink in campaign finance law, given the relative impunity with which candidates now act and disregard campaign finance rules. Attorney Ben W. Heineman Jr. wrote in The Atlantic that "making damning facts public will be necessary to present a case" that "unmasks the claim" of super PACs being independent of their chosen candidates. However, for the time being, it seems as though tackling coordination in any meaningful way is unlikely. Even the Chairwoman of the Federal Election Commission, Ann M. Ravel, admitted, "The likelihood of the laws being enforced is slim. ... I never want to give up, but I'm not under any illusions. People think the F.E.C. is dysfunctional. It's worse than dysfunctional."

=== Important Supreme Court decisions ===
In 1976, the United States Supreme Court ruled on Buckley v. Valeo, a case which challenged most of the provisions in the Federal Election Campaign Act. The court upheld the law's limits on contributions to candidates for Federal office. The Court did not, however, uphold limits on expenditures made by candidates or on independent expenditures.

In 2010, the U.S. Court of Appeals for the District of Columbia Circuit held in Speechnow.org v. Federal Election Commission that political action committees (PACs) and other groups that made independent expenditures, but not contributions to candidate committees or parties, could accept contributions without restriction as to source or size.

== See also ==
- Mayday PAC
- 527 group
- Issue advocacy ads
- Lobbying in the United States
- Political action committee
- Politics of the United States
- Soft money
