= America Coming Together =

American progressive political group

America Coming Together (ACT) (founded in 2003) was a progressive, political action 527 group dedicated to get-out-the-vote activities. ACT did not specifically endorse any political party but worked almost exclusively on behalf of Democratic candidates. It was the largest 527 (tax-exempt) group in 2004 and was planning to be involved in future races.The group was primarily funded by insurance mogul Peter Lewis, currency trader George Soros, and labor unions, especially the Service Employees International Union, and was led by Steve Rosenthal, a former political director of the AFL–CIO.

== History ==
Starting in mid-2004, the album Wake Up Everybody was recorded by more than 90 musical acts under the direction of Kenneth "Babyface" Edmonds, for the purpose of getting more young adults to register and vote.

In the three weeks before the 2004 presidential and congressional elections, ACT planned on funding over 12 million phone calls to targeted voters and having canvassers hand-deliver 11 million pieces of literature at targeted doorsteps. On Election Day, ACT had projected to have 45,000 paid canvassers in the battleground states and spent over $10 million on Election Day. It had 86 offices open every day, with a staff of 4,000 and a goal of reinforcing the army of 45,000 paid canvassers with 25,000 volunteers.

In the fall of 2004, ACT was featured in the Frontline Documentary The Persuaders, which described ACT's use of narrowcasting.

In 2005 ACT was in the process of being wound down. Its website was not renewed and is no longer operational.

The Federal Election Commission announced on August 29, 2007, that it had reached a settlement agreement with ACT for violations of various federal campaign finance laws during the 2004 US presidential campaign. ACT agreed to pay $775,000 in fines.
