= Political action committee =

American political organization

In the United States, a political action committee (PAC) is a tax-exempt 527 organization that pools campaign contributions from members and donates those funds to campaigns for or against candidates, ballot initiatives, or legislation. The legal term PAC was created in pursuit of campaign finance reform in the United States. Democracies of other countries use different terms for the units of campaign spending or spending on political competition (see political finance). At the U.S. federal level, an organization becomes a PAC when it receives or spends more than $1,000 for the purpose of influencing a federal election, and registers with the Federal Election Commission (FEC), according to the Federal Election Campaign Act as amended by the Bipartisan Campaign Reform Act of 2002 (also known as the McCain–Feingold Act). At the state level, an organization becomes a PAC according to the state's election laws.

Contributions to PACs from corporate or labor union treasuries are illegal, though these entities may sponsor a PAC and provide financial support for its administration and fundraising. Union-affiliated PACs may solicit contributions only from union members. Independent PACs may solicit contributions from the general public and must pay their own costs from those funds.

== Overview ==
Federal multi-candidate PACs may contribute to candidates as follows:

- $5,000 to a candidate or candidate committee for each election (primary and general elections count as separate elections);
- $15,000 to a political party per year; and
- $5,000 to another PAC per year.
- PACs may make unlimited expenditures independently of a candidate or political party

In its 2010 case Citizens United v. FEC, the Supreme Court of the United States enjoined enforcement of sections of the Campaign Reform Act of 2002 (also known as the McCain–Feingold Act) that had prohibited corporate and union independent expenditures in political campaigns. Citizens United declared it was unconstitutional to prohibit corporations and unions from using general treasury funds to make independent expenditures in candidate elections. It left intact these laws' prohibitions on corporations or unions contributing directly to a candidate or candidate committee.

== History ==
The political action committee emerged from the labor movement of 1943. The first PAC was the CIO-PAC, formed in July 1943 under CIO president Philip Murray and headed by Sidney Hillman. It was established after the U.S. Congress prohibited unions from giving direct contributions to political candidates. This restriction was initially imposed in 1907 on corporations through the Tillman Act. The Smith–Connally Act extended its coverage to labor unions in 1943. A series of campaign reform laws enacted during the 1970s facilitated the growth of PACs after these laws allowed corporations, trade associations, and labor unions to form PACs. In 1971 the Federal Election Campaign Act (FECA) created rules for disclosure, which made it so all donations received by PACs must go through a central committee maintained by said PAC. Furthermore, it required PACs to file regular reports with the Federal Election Commission (FEC) disclosing anyone who has donated at least $200. The Supreme Court has declared unconstitutional limits imposed on PACs by the legislature under First Amendment grounds in many cases, starting with Buckley v. Valeo.

Throughout the past 30 years, campaign donations from PACs have been increasingly growing, with $333 million being raised in 1990 to $482 million in 2022. Even with the major growth, PAC contributions only made up 23% of the money raised by House candidates and only 10% for senate candidates, despite media coverage which tends to exaggerate contributions.

== Categorization ==
Federal law formally allows for two types of PACs: connected and non-connected. Judicial decisions added a third classification, independent expenditure-only committees, which are colloquially known as "super PACs".

=== Connected PACs ===
Most of the 4,600 active, registered PACs, named "connected PACs", sometimes also called "corporate PACs", are established by businesses, non-profits, labor unions, trade groups, or health organizations. These PACs receive and raise money from a "restricted class", generally consisting of managers and shareholders in the case of a corporation or members in the case of a non-profit organization, labor union or other interest group. As of January 2009, there were 1,598 registered corporate PACs, 272 related to labor unions and 995 to trade organizations.

=== Non-connected PACs ===
Groups with an ideological mission, single-issue groups, and members of Congress and other political leaders may form "non-connected PACs". These organizations may accept funds from any individual, connected PAC, or organization. As of January 2009, there were 1,594 non-connected PACs, the fastest-growing category.

==== Leadership PACs ====
Elected officials and political parties cannot give more than the federal limit directly to candidates. However, they can set up a leadership PAC that makes independent expenditures. Provided the expenditure is not coordinated with the other candidate, this type of spending is not limited.

Under the Federal Election Commission (FEC) rules, leadership PACs are non-connected PACs, and can accept donations from individuals and other PACs. Since current officeholders have an easier time attracting contributions, leadership PACs are a way dominant parties can capture seats from other parties. A leadership PAC sponsored by an elected official cannot use funds to support that official's own campaign. However, it may fund travel, administrative expenses, consultants, polling, and other non-campaign expenses.

In the 2018 election cycle, leadership PACs donated more than $67 million to federal candidates. The number remained steady during the 2024 election cycle, with leadership PACs donating nearly $69 million to federal candidates. According to the government watchdog group OpenSecrets, 764 total PACs donated about $41.5 million to Republicans and $26.5 million to Democrats.

===== Controversial use of leadership PACs =====
- Former Rep. John Doolittle's (R-CA) leadership PAC paid 15% to a firm that employed only his wife. Payouts to his wife's firm were $68,630 in 2003 and 2004, and $224,000 in 2005 and 2006. The Doolittle home was raided in 2007. After years of investigation, the Justice Department dropped the case with no charges in June 2010.
- Former Rep. Richard Pombo (R-CA) used his leadership PAC to pay hotel bills ($22,896) and buy baseball tickets ($320) for donors.
- Speaker of the House Nancy Pelosi's (D-CA) leadership PAC, Team Majority, was fined $21,000 by federal election officials "for improperly accepting donations over federal limits."
- President Trump's leadership PAC, Save America, paid $650,000 for portraits of him and the first lady that will one day hang in the Smithsonian's National Portrait Gallery, $200,000 to Trump Hotel properties, and $132,000 to First Lady Melania Trump's fashion stylist.

=== Super PACs ===
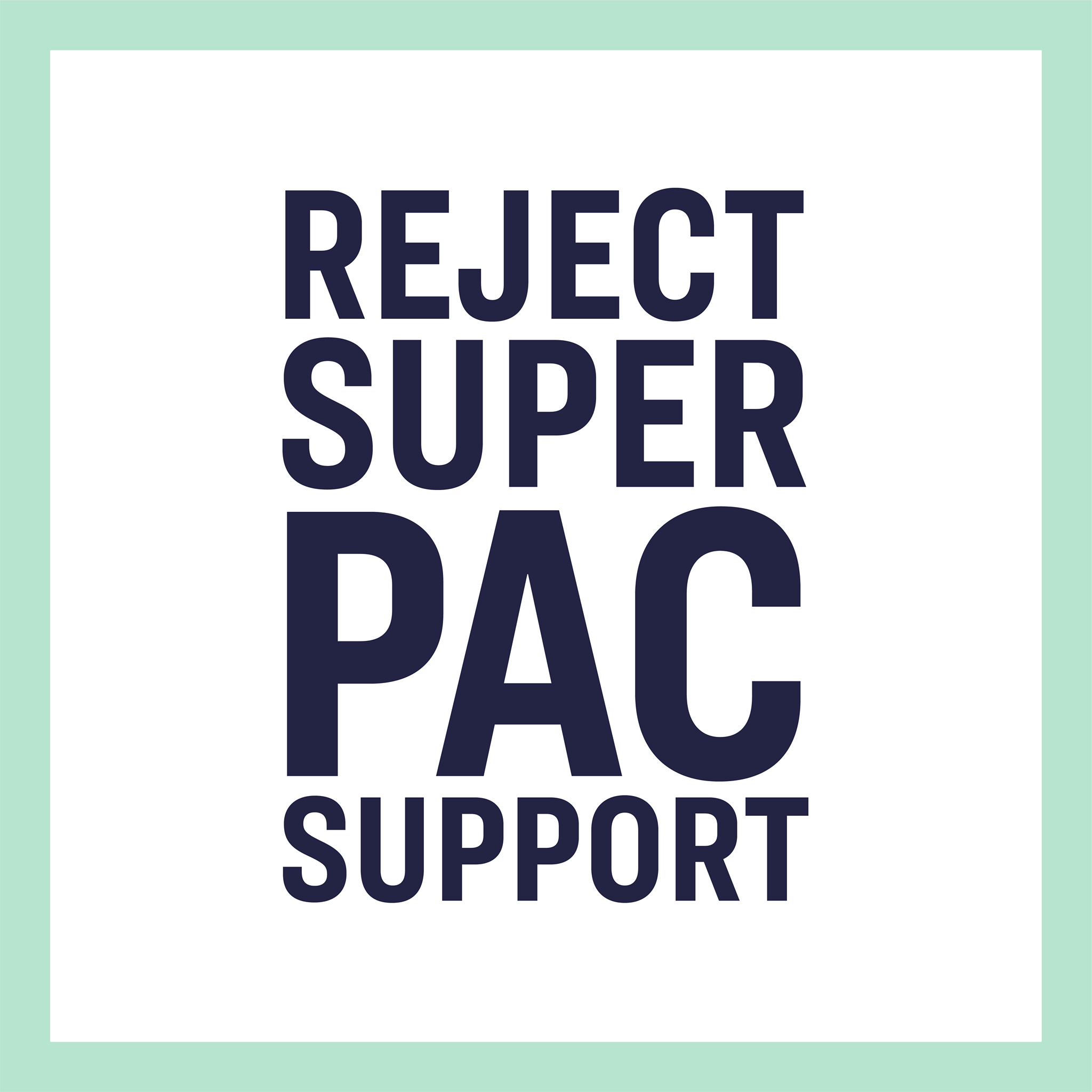
A Facebook post made by Elizabeth Warren during her 2020 presidential campaign criticizing super PACs

Super PACs, officially known as "independent expenditure-only political action committees", are unlike traditional PACs in that they may raise unlimited amounts from individuals, corporations, unions, and other groups to spend on, for example, ads overtly advocating for or against political candidates. However, they are not allowed to either coordinate with or contribute directly to candidate campaigns or political parties. Super PACs are subject to the same organizational, reporting, and public disclosure requirements of traditional PACs.

=== Hybrid PACs ===
A hybrid PAC (sometimes called a Carey Committee) is similar to a super PAC, but can give limited amounts of money directly to campaigns and committees, while still making independent expenditures in unlimited amounts.

== Top PACs by election cycle ==
OpenSecrets maintains a list of the largest PACs by election cycle on its website OpenSecrets.org. Their list can be filtered by receipts or different types of expenses, political party, and type of PAC.

=== 2018 election ===
In the 2018 election, the top ten PACs donated a total of $29,349,895 (directly, and via their affiliates and subsidiaries) to federal candidates:

1. National Association of Realtors – $3,444,276
2. National Beer Wholesalers Association – $3,433,500
3. AT&T – $3,433,500
4. Northrop Grumman PAC – $2,849,740
5. National Air Traffic Controllers Association – $2,813,250
6. International Association of Sheet Metal, Air, Rail and Transportation Workers – $2,797,450
7. American Bankers Association – $2,768,330
8. House Freedom Fund, a leadership PAC associated with Mark Meadows – $2,733,340
9. International Union of Operating Engineers – $2,726,909
10. National Auto Dealers Association – $2,666,400

=== 2020 election ===
In the 2020 election, the top ten PACs donated a total of $28,276,448 (directly, and via their affiliates and subsidiaries) to federal candidates:

1. National Association of Realtors – $3,960,998
2. National Beer Wholesalers Association – $3,147,500
3. Credit Union National Association – $2,849,800
4. AT&T Inc. – $2,742,000
5. American Crystal Sugar – $2,702,500
6. Comcast – $2,664,500
7. American Bankers Association – $2,661,200
8. International Union of Operating Engineers – $2,599,700
9. Sheet Metal, Air, Rail, & Transportation Union – $2,488,150
10. Majority Committee PAC, a leadership PAC associated with Kevin McCarthy – $2,460,100

=== 2022 election ===
In the 2022 election, the top ten PACs donated a total of $28,051,395 (directly, and via their affiliates and subsidiaries) to federal candidates:

1. National Association of Realtors – $4,001,500
2. National Beer Wholesalers Association – $3,258,000
3. Credit Union National Association – $2,888,500
4. American Israel Public Affairs Committee – $2,664,900
5. American Crystal Sugar – $2,624,000
6. AT&T Inc. – $2,609,400
7. Blue Cross/Blue Shield – $2,561,225
8. International Union of Operating Engineers – $2,533,920
9. National Auto Dealers Association – $2,514,000
10. American Bankers Association – $2,395,950

=== 2024 election ===
In the 2024 election, the top 10 PACs donated a total of $25,995,526 (directly, and via their affiliates and subsidiaries) to federal candidates:

1. National Association of Realtors – $3,751,000
2. Blue Cross/Blue Shield – $2,705,050
3. American Crystal Sugar – $2,667,500
4. National Beer Wholesalers Association – $2,585,000
5. American Israel Public Affairs Committee – $2,572,500
6. Operating Engineers Union – $2,528,306
7. America's Credit Unions – $2,489,160
8. American Bankers Association – $2,249,580
9. Sheet Metal, Air, Rail & Transportation Union – $2,226,900
10. Trump 47 Committee – $2,220,530

== See also ==
- List of political action committees
- 501(c)(4) organizations
- Advocacy group
- Campaign finance in the United States
- Dark money
- Issue advocacy ads
- Lobbying in the United States
- Money loop
- Politics of the United States
- Soft money
- United Democracy Project (UDP)
