= Bipartisan Campaign Reform Act =

2002 American law regulating political campaigns

Bipartisan Campaign Reform Act of 2002
- Long title: An act to amend the Federal Election Campaign Act of 1971 to provide bipartisan campaign reform.
- Acronyms (colloquial): BCRA (pronounced /ˈbɪkrə/ BIK-ruh)
- Nicknames: McCain–Feingold, Shays–Meehan
- Enacted by: the 107th United States Congress
- Effective: November 6, 2002

Citations
- Public law: 107-155
- Statutes at Large: 116 Stat. 81 thru 116 Stat. 116

Legislative history
- Introduced in the House as H.R. 2356 by Chris Shays (R–CT) on June 28, 2001; Committee consideration by Committee on House Administration, House Energy and Commerce, House Judiciary; Passed the House on February 14, 2002 (240–189); Passed the Senate on March 20, 2002 (60–40); Signed into law by President George W. Bush on March 26, 2002

United States Supreme Court cases
- McConnell v. FEC, 540 U.S. 93 (2003); Wisconsin Right to Life, Inc. v. Federal Election Commission, 546 U.S. 410 (2006); FEC v. Wisconsin Right to Life, Inc., 551 U.S. 449 (2007); Davis v. FEC, 554 U.S. 724 (2008); Citizens United v. FEC, 558 U.S. 310 (2010); McCutcheon v. Federal Election Commission, 572 U.S. 185 (2014); FEC v. Ted Cruz for Senate, No. 21-12, 596 U.S. ___ (2022)

The Bipartisan Campaign Reform Act of 2002 (Pub. L. 107–155 (text) (PDF), 116 Stat. 81, enacted March 27, 2002, H.R. 2356), commonly known as the McCain–Feingold Act or BCRA (/ˈbɪkrə/ BIK-ruh), is a United States federal law that amended the Federal Election Campaign Act of 1971, which regulates the financing of political campaigns. Its chief sponsors were senators John McCain (R-AZ) and Russ Feingold (D-WI). The law became effective on November 6, 2002, and the new legal limits became effective on January 1, 2003.

As noted in McConnell v. FEC, a United States Supreme Court ruling on BCRA, the act was designed to address two issues:

- The increased role of soft money in campaign financing, by prohibiting national political party committees from raising or spending any funds not subject to federal limits, even for state and local races or issue discussion;
- The proliferation of issue advocacy ads, by defining broadcast ads that name a federal candidate within 30 days of a primary or caucus or 60 days of a general election as "electioneering communications", and prohibiting any such ad paid for by a corporation (including non-profit issue organizations such as Right to Life or the Environmental Defense Fund) or paid for by an unincorporated entity using any corporate or union general treasury funds. The decision in Citizens United v. FEC overturns this provision, but not the ban on foreign corporations or foreign nationals in decisions regarding political spending.

Although the legislation is known as "McCain–Feingold," the Senate version is not the bill that became law. Instead, the companion legislation, H.R. 2356—introduced by Rep. Chris Shays (R-CT), is the version that became law. Shays–Meehan was originally introduced as H.R. 380.

== History of the bill ==
In the aftermath of Watergate, Congress passed the Federal Election Campaign Act Amendments of 1974, which put new limits on contributions to campaigns. Four years later, the FEC ruled that donors could donate unlimited money to political parties (but not the candidates themselves) if the party used that money for "party building activities" such as voter registration drives, but not to directly support candidates. Both the Republican and Democratic parties nonetheless used this money to support their candidates, and money donated to parties became known as soft money. In 1992, President George H. W. Bush vetoed a bill passed by the Democratic Congress that would have, among other things, restricted the use of soft money. President Clinton pushed for a similar bill, but was unable to get both houses to agree on one bill.

In 1995, senators John McCain (R-AZ) and Russ Feingold (D-WI) jointly published an op-ed calling for campaign finance reform, and began working on their own bill. In 1998, the Senate voted on the bill, but the bill failed to meet the 60 vote threshold to defeat a filibuster. All 45 Senate Democrats and 6 Senate Republicans voted to invoke cloture, but the remaining 49 Republicans voted against invoking cloture. This effectively killed the bill for the remainder of the 105th Congress.

McCain's 2000 campaign for president and a series of scandals (including the Enron scandal) brought the issue of campaign finance to the fore of public consciousness in 2001. McCain and Feingold pushed the bill in the Senate, while Chris Shays (R-CT) and Marty Meehan (D-MA) led the effort to pass the bill in the House. In just the second successful use of the discharge petition since the 1980s, a mixture of Democrats and Republicans defied Speaker Dennis Hastert and passed a campaign finance reform bill. The House approved the bill with a 240–189 vote, sending the bill to the Senate. The bill passed the Senate in a 60–40 vote. Throughout the congressional battle on the bill, President Bush declined to take a strong position, but nonetheless signed the bill into law in March 2002 after it cleared both houses of Congress.

== Legal disputes ==
Provisions of the legislation were challenged as unconstitutional by a group of plaintiffs led by then–Senate Majority Whip Mitch McConnell, a long-time opponent of the bill. President Bush signed the law despite "reservations about the constitutionality of the broad ban on issue advertising." He appeared to expect that the Supreme Court would overturn some of its key provisions. But, in December 2003, the Supreme Court upheld most of the legislation in McConnell v. FEC.

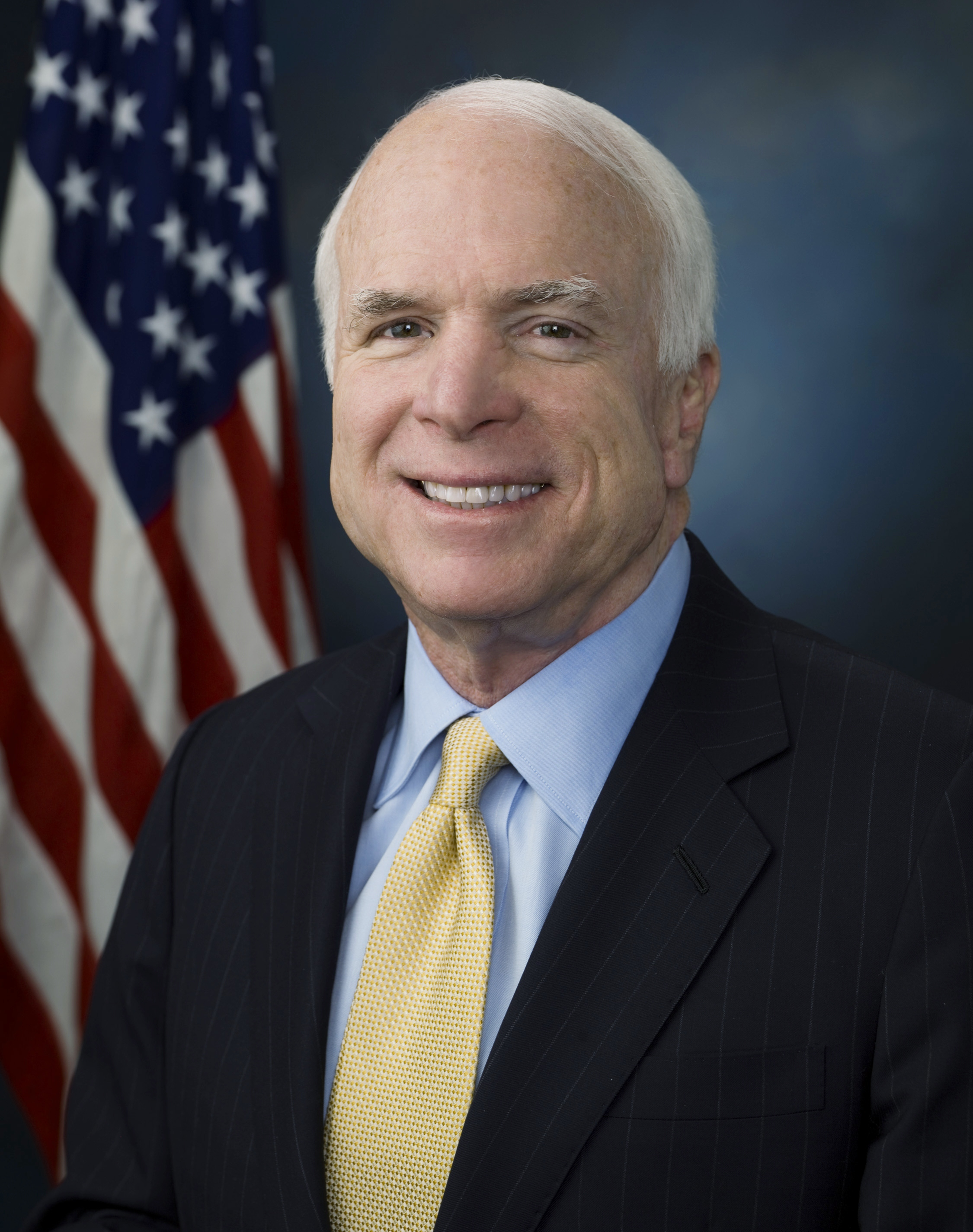
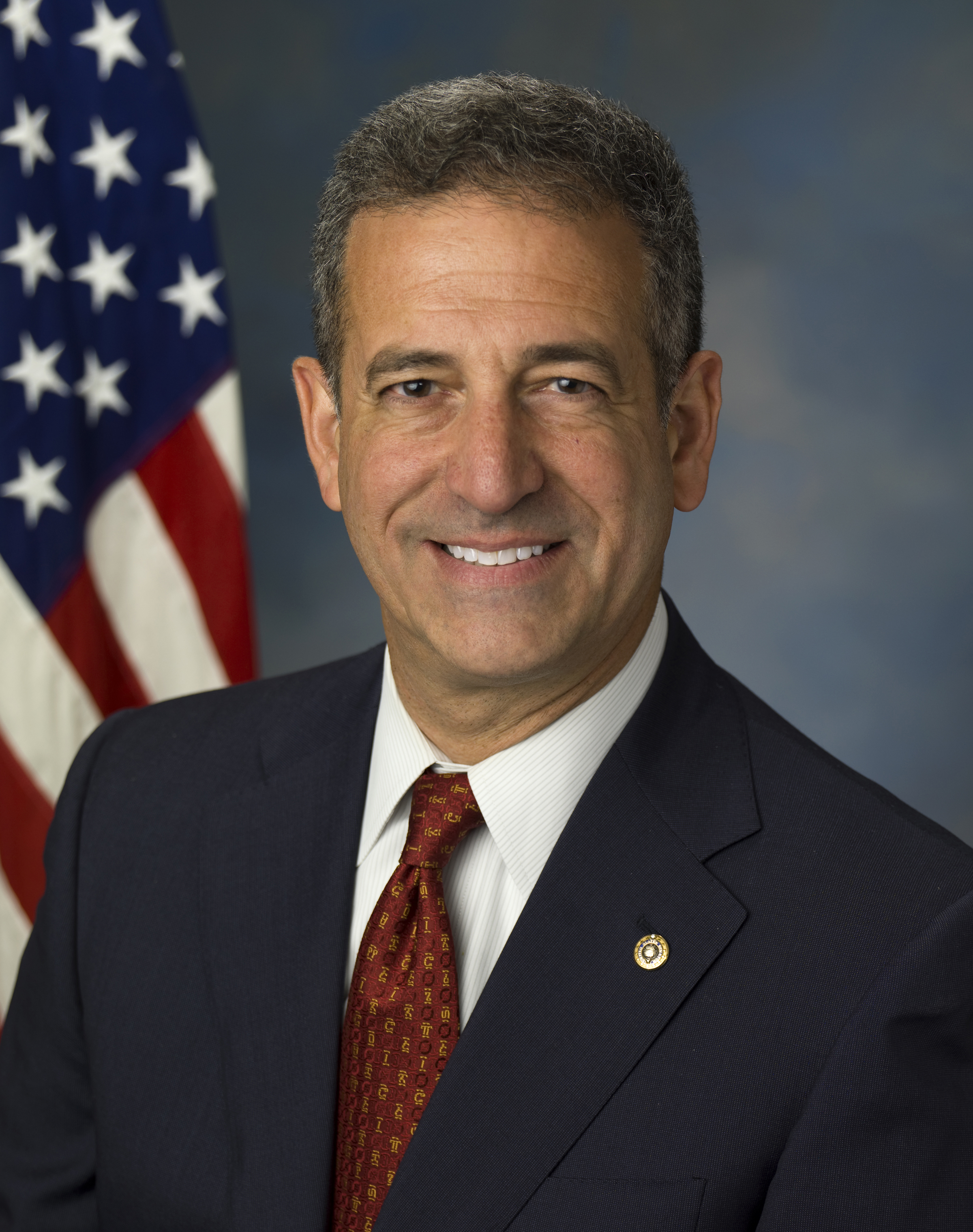
BCRA's lead sponsors, Senator John McCain (R-AZ) and Senator Russ Feingold (D-WI)

Subsequently, political parties and "watchdog" organizations have filed complaints with the FEC concerning the raising and spending of soft money by so-called "527 organizations"—organizations claiming tax-exemption as "political organizations" under Section 527 of the Internal Revenue Code (26 U.S.C. § 527), but not registering as "political committees" under the Federal Election Campaign Act, which uses a different legal definition. These organizations have been established on both sides of the political aisle, and have included high-profile organizations such as the Media Fund and the Swift Boat Veterans for Truth. 527s are financed in large part by wealthy individuals, labor unions, and businesses. 527s pre-dated McCain–Feingold but grew in popularity after the law took effect. In May 2004, the FEC voted to not write new rules on the application of federal campaign finance laws to 527 organizations. Although the FEC did promulgate a new rule in the fall of 2004 requiring some 527s participating in federal campaigns to use at least 50% "hard money" (contributions regulated by the Federal Election Campaign Act) to pay their expenses, the FEC did not change its regulations on when a 527 organization must register as a federal "political committee"-prompting Representatives Shays and Meehan to file a federal court lawsuit against the FEC for the Commission's failure to adopt a 527 rule. In September, 2007, a Federal District Court ruled in favor of the FEC, against congressmen Shays and Meehan.

In December 2006 the FEC entered settlements with three 527 groups the commission found to have violated federal law by failing to register as "political committees" and abide by contribution limits, source prohibitions and disclosure requirements during the 2004 election cycle. Swift Boat Veterans for Truth was fined $299,500; the League of Conservation Voters was fined $180,000; MoveOn.org was fined $150,000. In February 2007, the 527 organization Progress for America Voter Fund was likewise fined $1,750,000 for its failure to abide by federal campaign finance laws during the 2004 election cycle.

In June 2007 the U.S. Supreme Court held, in FEC v. Wisconsin Right to Life, Inc., that BCRA's limitations on corporate and labor union funding of broadcast ads mentioning a candidate within 30 days of a primary or caucus or 60 days of a general election are unconstitutional as applied to ads susceptible of a reasonable interpretation other than as an appeal to vote for or against a specific candidate. Some election law experts believed that the new exception would render BCRA's "electioneering communication" provisions meaningless, while others believed the new exception to be quite narrow.

In June 2008, the section of the act known as the "millionaire's amendment" was overturned by the Supreme Court in Davis v. Federal Election Commission. This provision had attempted to "equalize" campaigns by providing that the legal limit on contributions would increase for a candidate who was substantially outspent by an opposing candidate using personal wealth. In 2008 one of the cosponsors of the legislation, Senator John McCain of Arizona, touted this piece of legislation and others that he sponsored in his bid for the presidency. Senator McCain consistently voiced concern over campaign practices and their funding. "'Questions of honor are raised as much by appearances as by reality in politics, and because they incite public distrust, they need to be addressed no less directly than we would address evidence of expressly illegal corruption,' McCain wrote in his 2002 memoir Worth the Fighting For. 'By the time I became a leading advocate of campaign finance reform, I had come to appreciate that the public's suspicions were not always mistaken. Money does buy access in Washington, and access increases influence that often results in benefiting the few at the expense of the many.'"

In March 2009, the U.S. Supreme Court heard oral arguments in Citizens United v. Federal Election Commission, regarding whether or not a political documentary about Hillary Clinton could be considered a political ad that must be paid for with funds regulated under the Federal Election Campaign Act. In January 2010, the Supreme Court struck down sections of McCain–Feingold which limited activity of corporations, saying, "If the First Amendment has any force, it prohibits Congress from fining or jailing citizens, or associations of citizens, for simply engaging in political speech." Specifically, Citizens United struck down campaign financing laws related to corporations and unions; law previously banned the broadcast, cable or satellite transmission of "electioneering communications" paid for by corporations in the 30 days before a presidential primary and in the 60 days before the general election. The minority argued that the court erred in allowing unlimited corporate spending, arguing that corporate spending posed a particular threat to democratic self-government.

President Barack Obama expressed his concern over the Supreme Court's decision during his 2010 State of the Union Address, delivered January 27, saying, "With all due deference to separation of powers, last week the Supreme Court reversed a century of law that I believe will open the floodgates for special interests—including foreign corporations—to spend without limit in our elections. I don't think American elections should be bankrolled by America's most powerful interests, or worse, by foreign entities. They should be decided by the American people. And I'd urge Democrats and Republicans to pass a bill that helps to correct some of these problems." President Obama also called the decision, "a major victory for big oil, Wall Street banks, health insurance companies and the other powerful interests that marshal their power every day in Washington to drown out the voices of everyday Americans."

== Impact ==
BCRA decreased the role of soft money in political campaigns as the law places limits on the contributions by interest groups and national political parties. BCRA had a "Stand by Your Ad" Provision, which requires candidates in the United States for federal political office, as well as interest groups and political parties supporting or opposing a candidate, to include in political advertisements on television and radio "a statement by the candidate that identifies the candidate and states that the candidate has approved the communication."

The impact of BCRA first started being felt nationally with the 2004 elections. One immediately recognizable result was that, as a result of the so-called stand by your ad provision, all campaign advertisements included a verbal statement to the effect of "I'm [candidate's name] and I approve this message."
