= FEC v. Wisconsin Right to Life, Inc. =

Federal Election Commission v. Wisconsin Right to Life, Inc.
- Supreme Court of the United States

Argued April 25, 2007 Decided June 25, 2007
- Full case name: Federal Election Commission v. Wisconsin Right to Life, Inc.
- Docket no.: 06-969
- Citations: 551 U.S. 449 (more) 127 S. Ct. 2652; 168 L. Ed. 2d 329; 2007 U.S. LEXIS 8515

Case history
- Prior: Injunction denied, No. 04-1260, 2004 U.S. Dist. LEXIS 29036 (D.D.C. Aug. 17, 2004); injunction denied, appeal dismissed, No. 04-1260, 2004 U.S. App. LEXIS 18795, (D.D.C. Sept. 1, 2004); injunction denied, 542 U.S. 1305 (2004) (Rehnquist, C.J.); dismissed, No. 04-1260, 2005 U.S. Dist. LEXIS 17226 (D.D.C. May 9, 2005); probable jurisdiction noted, 126 S. Ct. 36 (2005); vacated and remanded, 546 U.S. 410 (2006); summary judgment granted, 466 F. Supp. 2d 195; cert. granted.

Holding
- Section 203 of the Bipartisan Campaign Reform Act of 2002 is constitutional to the extent that it deals with advertisements which expressly advocate for the victory or defeat of a political candidate in the months which immediately precede elections.

Court membership
- Chief Justice John Roberts Associate Justices John P. Stevens · Antonin Scalia; Anthony Kennedy · David Souter; Clarence Thomas · Ruth Bader Ginsburg; Stephen Breyer · Samuel Alito

Case opinions
- Majority: Roberts (Parts I and II), joined by Scalia, Kennedy, Thomas, Alito
- Plurality: Roberts (Parts III and IV), joined by Alito
- Concurrence: Alito
- Concurrence: Scalia (in part), joined by Kennedy, Thomas
- Dissent: Souter, joined by Stevens, Ginsburg, Breyer

Laws applied
- U.S. Const. amend. I

Federal Election Commission v. Wisconsin Right to Life, Inc., 551 U.S. 449 (2007), is a United States Supreme Court case in which the Court held that issue ads may not be banned from the months preceding a primary or general election.

== Background ==
In 2002, the Congress passed the Bipartisan Campaign Reform Act ("McCain–Feingold" or "BCRA"), amending the Federal Election Campaign Act to further regulate money in public election campaigns. One primary purpose of the legislation was to regulate what were colloquially known as "issue ads." "Issue ads" typically discussed a named candidate's views regarding a particular issue, but because they did not expressly advocate the election or defeat of the candidate, they fell outside the prohibitions and limitations of the Federal Election Campaign Act. Section 203 of BCRA prohibited corporations and unions from directly or indirectly funding "electioneering communications," defined as broadcast ads costing in excess of an aggregated $10,000 that mentioned a candidate for federal political office within 30 days of a primary election or 60 days of a general election. In McConnell v. Federal Election Commission, the Supreme Court upheld section 203 and other sections of the Bipartisan Campaign Reform Act against a facial challenge that the law was unconstitutional.

Wisconsin Right to Life Inc. ("WRTL"), a nonprofit advocacy group, sought to run ads asking voters to contact their Senators and urge them to oppose filibusters of judicial nominees. (The text of one of WRTL's proposed ads is listed at the conclusion of this article). WRTL sought to run its ads within the 30- and 60-day blackout provisions of BCRA. However, because WRTL was itself incorporated and also because it accepted corporate contributions, it was prohibited from doing so. WRTL argued that the proposed ads addressed a current issue pending in Congress and did not advocate the election or defeat of a candidate. As such, the government had no compelling interest in prohibiting them from airing even during the election session.

In the first round of litigation, the federal district court ruled that the language of McConnell v. FEC precluded not only a facial challenge, but also an "as applied" challenge to this portion of BCRA and so dismissed the case. However, in Wisconsin Right to Life v. Federal Election Commission ("WRTL I"), the Supreme Court reversed and remanded the case to the lower courts to determine whether or not WRTL should be granted an "as applied" exception to the law.

On remand, the FEC argued that ads run so close to an election and naming a candidate or candidates should be presumed to have the intent of influencing the election, and thus BCRA's limitation on financing such ads with corporate funds was constitutionally valid. It argued that WRTL's specific ads were intended to and would influence the 2004 Senate election in Wisconsin. The district court rejected the FEC's argument and refused to delve into the matter of the intent and underlying meaning of the ads. The Court stated that such an investigation would be impractical and would "have a chilling effect on protected speech." The District court thus limited its review to that content of the ad. In doing so, the court found that they were not "sham" issue ads and did not expressly advocate for or against a candidate. It, therefore, found that the government lacked a compelling interest to abridge WRTL's rights of free speech. The FEC appealed and the case returned to the Supreme Court.

== Opinion of the Supreme Court ==
The Supreme Court, in a 5–4 decision, crafted a major exception to the limitations on broadcast ads within 30 days of a primary or 60 days of a general election. The court ruled that unless an ad could not reasonably be interpreted as anything other than an ad urging the support or defeat of a candidate (in other words, unless an ad expressly urges support or defeat of a candidate), it was eligible for an "as applied" exception to the McCain–Feingold limits on issue ads close to an election.

The decision of the Court, authored by Chief Justice John G. Roberts, is notable not only for its holding, affirming the lower court, but for its strong language (repeatedly referring to BCRA's prohibition as the "blackout" period; rebuking calls for greater regulation of political speech by declaring "Enough is enough"; and concluding "we give the benefit of the doubt to speech, not censorship") and for demonstrating a skepticism of campaign finance regulation that was absent in McConnell. In the opinion, Roberts argued that Congress's ability to limit speech about politicians and issues was limited to "express advocacy or its functional equivalent." Roberts endorsed the lower court's view that it would be improper and would chill speech to subject speakers to an extensive investigation of motive and factor surrounding the ad and, instead, limited review to the content of the ad itself. Although, in theory, the opinion left BCRA's prohibition on "electioneering communications" standing and conformed with McConnell v. FEC, for most practical purposes, it cut deeply into the law, reverting it to its pre-McConnell state in which only speech expressly advocating the election or defeat of a candidate could be constitutionally subject to limits and prohibitions on financing. Though announcing the Court's judgment, Roberts' opinion was joined only by Justice Samuel Alito. The rest of the majority consisted of Justices Antonin Scalia, Anthony Kennedy, and Clarence Thomas, who would have gone further and simply reversed McConnell outright.

Justices John Paul Stevens, Stephen Breyer, David Souter, and Ruth Bader Ginsburg dissented.

Although "WRTL II," as the case is generally called, remains an important marker in First Amendment campaign finance jurisprudence, as a practical matter, it has been largely superseded by the Court's 2010 decision in Citizens United v. Federal Election Commission.

== Proposed text of WRTL ad ==
[Wedding scene]
PASTOR: And who gives this woman to be married to this man?
BRIDE'S FATHER: Well, as father of the bride, I certainly could. But instead, I'd like to share a few tips on how to properly install drywall. Now you put the drywall up ...
VOICE-OVER: Sometimes it's just not fair to delay an important decision. But in Washington, it's happening. A group of Senators are using the filibuster delay tactic to block federal judicial nominees from a simple "yes" or "no" vote. So qualified candidates don't get a chance to serve. It's politics at work, causing gridlock and backing up some of our courts to a state of emergency. Contact Senators Feingold and Kohl and tell them to oppose the filibuster.

Paid for by Wisconsin Right to Life, which is responsible for the content of this advertising and not authorized by any candidate or candidates committee.

== See also ==
- Citizens United v. Federal Election Commission
- FEC v. National Conservative PAC
- FEC v. Massachusetts Citizens for Life
- James Bopp
