= James E. Trainor III =

American lawyer and former Federal Election Commission commissioner

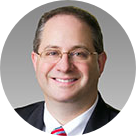
- Trey Trainor

Commissioner of the Federal Election Commission
- In office June 5, 2020 – October 3, 2025
- President: Donald Trump; Joe Biden
- Preceded by: Matthew S. Petersen
- Succeeded by: TBD

Chair of the Federal Election Commission
- In office June 18, 2020 – December 31, 2020
- President: Donald Trump
- Preceded by: Caroline C. Hunter
- Succeeded by: Shana Broussard

Acting Chair of the Federal Election Commission
- In office February 2025 – June 30, 2025
- President: Donald Trump
- Preceded by: Ellen Weintraub
- Succeeded by: Shana Broussard

Personal details
- Born: James Edwin Trainor III Odessa, Texas, U.S.
- Party: Republican
- Spouse: Lucy Trainor
- Children: 6
- Education: Texas A&M UniversityTexas Wesleyan University School of Law
- Profession: Lawyer

Military service
- Service: United States Army Reserve

James Edwin "Trey" Trainor III is an American lawyer who served as a commissioner of the Federal Election Commission (FEC) from 2020 to 2025. He was elected chairman of the FEC for the remainder of 2020. In 2025, he served as vice chairman and as acting chairman during a transition in the commission's leadership.

Before joining the FEC, Trainor practiced election, campaign-finance, and government-ethics law and served as general counsel to the Texas Secretary of State and as counsel to the Texas House of Representatives Committee on Regulated Industries. He also served in the United States Department of Defense during the first Donald Trump administration.

Trainor was a Republican candidate for the U.S. House of Representatives in Texas's 21st congressional district in 2026. He finished third in the Republican primary.

== Early life and education ==
Trainor was born in Odessa, Texas. He attended Texas A&M University, where he was a member of the Texas A&M University Corps of Cadets, and graduated in 1997. He served in the United States Army Reserve and was honorably discharged in 2000.

Trainor earned his Juris Doctor degree from Texas A&M University School of Law in 2002. The law school was then known as Texas Wesleyan University School of Law. He was admitted to the State Bar of Texas in 2003.

== Legal and government career ==
Trainor began his legal and government career in Texas politics. He served as counsel to the Texas House Committee on Regulated Industries and worked for state representative Phil King.

He subsequently served as general counsel to the Texas Secretary of State. In that position, he worked on matters involving election administration and Texas election law.

Trainor also served on an advisory board of the United States Election Assistance Commission.

He later returned to private practice, including work as a partner at Akerman LLP and in his own private practice. His practice has focused on election law, campaign finance, government ethics, and constitutional matters.

Trainor served as counsel to Rick Perry's 2012 presidential campaign and was general counsel to the Republican National Committee's platform committee during the 2016 Republican National Convention. He subsequently worked on Donald Trump's 2016 presidential campaign.

== Trump administration ==
In January 2017, Trainor joined the United States Department of Defense as a special assistant to Secretary of Defense James Mattis. He worked in the Office of the General Counsel during the presidential transition and early months of the Trump administration.

In 2017, Trump nominated Trainor to serve as a commissioner of the Federal Election Commission. The nomination did not result in Senate confirmation at that time.

Trainor subsequently returned to private legal practice.

== Federal Election Commission ==
=== Nomination and confirmation ===
In 2020, Trump again nominated Trainor to the Federal Election Commission. The United States Senate confirmed him on May 19, 2020, by a vote of 49–43. He was sworn in as a commissioner on June 5, 2020.

Trainor served on the commission from June 5, 2020, until October 3, 2025.

=== 2020 chairmanship ===
On June 18, 2020, the commission elected Trainor chairman for the remainder of 2020, with Steven T. Walther serving as vice chairman.

During his chairmanship, Trainor publicly criticized procedural difficulties within the commission and emphasized the importance of the FEC's ability to carry out its statutory responsibilities.

=== Policy and rulemaking ===
During his tenure, Trainor participated in FEC rulemaking and policy matters concerning campaign-finance regulation and enforcement.

In 2022, Trainor joined an interpretive statement concerning internet disclaimers and the application of FEC regulations to internet communications. He also participated in a policy statement concerning contributions and earmarked political spending under 52 U.S.C. § 30104(c).

In June 2022, the commission adopted an interim final rule concerning independent-expenditure reporting.

In 2023, Trainor issued comments concerning the FEC's memorandum of understanding with the United States Department of Justice and the commission's audit procedures. He also joined a statement concerning the commission's procedures for investigations by its Office of General Counsel.

In January 2024, Trainor joined a statement concerning Legal Consideration 1193.

In September 2024, the FEC approved regulations concerning the use of campaign funds for candidate and officeholder security. The regulations became effective January 1, 2025.

In April 2025, Trainor joined an FEC policy statement concerning enforcement procedures.

=== Advisory opinions ===
Trainor issued or joined statements concerning several FEC advisory opinions, including Advisory Opinions 2023-03, 2023-08, 2023-09, and 2024-08.

=== Enforcement matters ===
During his tenure, Trainor issued or joined statements of reasons in a number of FEC enforcement matters, including MUR 6992; MURs 7645, 7663, and 7705; MUR 7800; MUR 7892; MURs 8215 and 8216; MUR 8117; MUR 8168; MUR 8274; MUR 8302; and MUR 8216R.

His statements addressed questions involving the scope of federal campaign-finance law, the commission's enforcement authority, statutory interpretation, and the procedures governing FEC investigations and enforcement decisions.

=== Congressional testimony ===
During his tenure at the FEC, Trainor testified before congressional committees concerning the administration and enforcement of federal campaign-finance law and the operation of the commission.

He appeared before the United States House Committee on House Administration in September 2023 and before the United States House Committee on the Judiciary in June 2024.

=== International election observation ===
Trainor participated in international election-observation activities during his tenure at the FEC, including election-related delegations to Costa Rica and Romania.

=== 2025 leadership and departure ===
In December 2024, the FEC elected Ellen Weintraub chairman and Trainor vice chairman for 2025.

Following changes in the commission's membership in 2025, Trainor served as acting chairman during the transition in leadership. On July 1, 2025, Shana Broussard became chairman for the remainder of the year.

Trainor's service on the FEC ended on October 3, 2025.

== Return to private practice ==
After leaving the FEC, Trainor returned to private practice as a partner at Dhillon Law Group. His practice includes election law, campaign finance, government ethics, and constitutional matters.

Trainor is board certified in Legislative and Campaign Law by the Texas Board of Legal Specialization.

== 2026 congressional campaign ==
In October 2025, Trainor announced his candidacy for the Republican nomination for the U.S. House of Representatives in Texas's 21st congressional district.

Trainor's campaign committee, Trey Trainor for Texas, was registered with the FEC on October 6, 2025.

The Republican primary was held March 3, 2026. Mark Teixeira won with 60.9 percent of the vote, followed by Jason Cahill with 9.5 percent. Trainor finished third with 8.9 percent, receiving 8,497 votes.

== Republican Party of Texas ==
In 2026, Trainor served as chair of the Republican Party of Texas Platform Committee at the party's state convention.

== Personal life ==
Trainor is married to Lucy Trainor. They have six children.
