= ActBlue =

American political fundraising organization

- Logo (2023–present)
- Formation: 2004; 22 years ago
- Type: Nonprofit political action committee
- Location: Somerville, Massachusetts
- President and CEO: Regina Wallace-Jones
- Affiliations: Democratic Party
- Website: actblue.com

ActBlue is an American Democratic Party affiliated political action committee (PAC) and fundraising platform founded in 2004. ActBlue is a major part of the Democratic Party's fundraising infrastructure. As of 2025, ActBlue reports that it has raised $16 billion for Democratic candidates and causes since it was established. ActBlue is organized as a PAC, but it serves as a conduit for processing individual contributions made through the platform. Under federal law, these contributions are made by individuals and are not considered PAC donations.

== History ==
ActBlue was founded in 2004 by Benjamin Rahn and Matt DeBergalis. Rahn and DeBergalis were joined in 2005 by Jonathan Zucker and Erin Hill. Zucker took over as executive director in 2007; he was replaced by Hill in 2009. In 2023, Regina Wallace-Jones replaced Hill as president and CEO of ActBlue.

Both the 2016 and 2020 Democratic presidential nominees, Hillary Clinton and Joe Biden, used ActBlue during their primary and general election campaigns. Bernie Sanders' 2016 and 2020 primary campaigns also used ActBlue for fundraising. Sanders' use of ActBlue was particularly notable as it represented the first time a major Democratic presidential candidate eschewed money from super PACs in favor of grassroots fundraising. This strategy would later be replicated by other Democratic political figures like Alexandria Ocasio-Cortez.

In the 2020 Democratic Party presidential primaries, all the candidates used ActBlue.

In 2023, ActBlue announced that it was laying off roughly 17 percent of its staff as part of what the group said was a "restructuring" that would help ensure "long-term financial sustainability".

In December 2024, 142 consultants, campaign staff, nonprofit staff, technology vendors, donor organizers, donors, and academics signed a letter to ActBlue saying the organization needed to do a "better job" of protecting Democratic contributors from being "exploited". In February 2025, seven senior staffers resigned from the organization. Resignations included the highest ranking legal officer, the vice president for customer service, and a technology staff member who had been with the organization for 14 years. Two unions representing ActBlue employees wrote to the board noting an "alarming pattern" of departures that was "eroding our confidence in the stability of the organization". As of March 5, 2025, the reasons for these departures were not publicly known.

== Organization ==
ActBlue does not endorse individual candidates. Use of the platform is open to Democratic and progressive campaigns, candidates, committees, and 501(c)4 organizations. 501(c)3 organizations are able to use the platform through ActBlue Charities.

Groups that use ActBlue pay a 3.95% credit card processing fee. As a nonprofit, ActBlue runs its own separate fundraising program and accepts tips on contributions to pay for its expenses.

== Campaign donation reporting ==
ActBlue, acting as a conduit under election law, must report the donors' names and amounts to the Federal Election Commission for all contributions to federal campaigns, regardless of the amount. This information is listed on the Internet. In contrast, small donors who contribute up to $200 directly to a federal campaign are not automatically reported to the FEC.

In 2024, the Institute for Free Speech sued the FEC over the discrepancy whereby small donors utilizing conduits ActBlue or WinRed are automatically made public but same-sized direct donations are not.

== Fundraising ==
ActBlue raised $19 million in its first three years, from 2004 to 2007. In the 2005–2006 campaign, the site raised $17 million for 1500 Democratic candidates, with $15.5 million going to congressional campaigns. By August 2007, the site had raised $25.5 million.

In 2016, ActBlue took in nearly $800 million in small-dollar donations.

In the 2018 midterm elections, Democratic candidates fundraised $1.6 billion through ActBlue's platform.

In 2019, ActBlue raised roughly $1 billion for Democratic campaigns. The Daily Beast noted that between January and mid-July 2019, ActBlue brought in $420 million.

In 2020, several fundraising records were broken. In the week following the murder of George Floyd, on May 31, over $19 million was raised, the highest single-day total so far that year. On June 1, that yearly record was again broken with $20 million in donations. Over half of all donations in the following week went to charitable (non-political) causes, including one ActBlue page devoted to a bail fund which raised over $1.5 million from over 20,000 donors. In the day following the death of Supreme Court Justice Ruth Bader Ginsburg, over $70 million was donated through ActBlue, again breaking the single-day fundraising record.

In 2022, ActBlue brought in $20.6 million on the day the Supreme Court issued its opinion in Dobbs v. Jackson Women's Health Organization.

In the first 24 hours following the launch of Kamala Harris's presidential campaign, small-dollar and many first-time donors raised $81 million through ActBlue, making it the biggest 24 hour period ever on the platform for dollars raised sitewide. Over the first weekend, they raised $100 million from 1.1 million donors.

== Legal investigations ==
ActBlue has repeatedly been the target of unsubstantiated accusations from Republican public officials and members of congress, including a presidential memorandum by Donald Trump that targeted them based on unverified claims that they accepted illegal foreign donations. The accusations against ActBlue stem partially from discredited social media posts and from allegations made by conservative activist James O’Keefe; experts in campaign finance law have expressed doubt about them. ActBlue has denied all allegations and described them as a "partisan political attack".

In April 2026, Texas Attorney General Ken Paxton filed a lawsuit alleging that ActBlue allowed fraudulent and foreign donations through its system; ActBlue leadership called the lawsuit "a thinly veiled attempt to distract from Ken Paxton's numerous legal and ethical issues ahead of next month's runoff", and Paxton would ultimately drop it after losing the 2026 election.

== See also ==
- WinRed – created in 2019 as a Republican version of ActBlue for small-donor fundraising
