= Shana M. Broussard =

Member of the U.S. Federal Election Commission

Shana Broussard
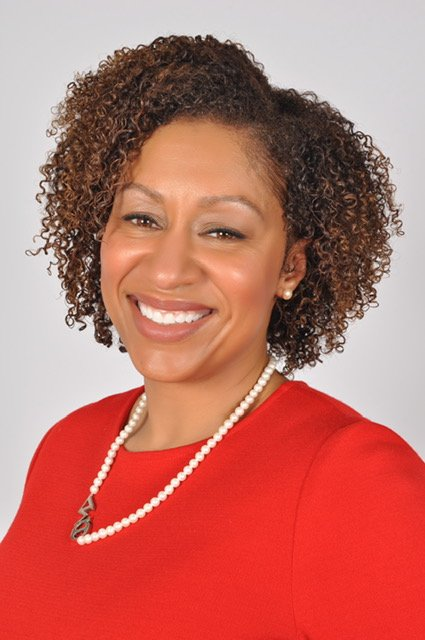

Chair of the Federal Election Commission
- Incumbent
- Assumed office July 1, 2025
- President: Donald Trump
- Preceded by: Ellen Weintraub
- In office January 1, 2021 – December 31, 2021
- President: Donald Trump; Joe Biden
- Preceded by: James E. Trainor III
- Succeeded by: Allen Dickerson

Commissioner of the Federal Election Commission
- Incumbent
- Assumed office December 15, 2020
- President: Donald Trump; Joe Biden
- Preceded by: Ann Ravel

Personal details
- Born: Santa Barbara, California, U.S.
- Party: Democratic
- Education: Dillard University (BA); Southern University (JD)

Shana M. Broussard is an American attorney who has served twice as the chair of the Federal Election Commission (FEC) for the year 2021 and since 2025. She has been a Democratic member of the FEC since December 15, 2020.

== Early life and education ==
Broussard was born on the Vandenberg Air Force Base in Santa Barbara, California, and raised in Louisiana. She earned a Bachelor of Arts degree from Dillard University and a Juris Doctor from Southern University Law Center.

== Career ==
Broussard was a clerk for a local court in Shreveport, Louisiana, and later clerked for the state appellate court. Broussard served as a New Orleans Assistant District Attorney, and later as an Attorney Advisor at the Internal Revenue Service and a Deputy Disciplinary Counsel at the Louisiana Attorney Disciplinary Board. She served as the counsel to FEC Commissioner Steven T. Walther.

=== Federal Election Commission ===
On October 28, 2020, President Donald Trump announced his intent to nominate Broussard to serve as a Commissioner of the Federal Election Commission, the first Black commissioner of the FEC, to fill the vacancy created by the resignation of Ann Ravel on March 1, 2017. Her nomination was sent to the Senate on October 30, 2020, and she was confirmed by the Senate by a vote of 92–4 on December 9, 2020. She was sworn in on December 15, 2020, with her term as Commissioner of the FEC expiring on April 30, 2023. On December 22, 2020, she was elected chair for the 2021 year. In May 2021, Broussard opposed the FEC's decision not to investigate Donald Trump for allegedly using campaign funds to cover up hush money payments to Stormy Daniels. In June 2023, Broussard voted in favor of a petition requesting that the FEC develop guidelines for the use of artificial intelligence in campaign advertisements.

Legal offices
Preceded by Ann Ravel	Commissioner of the Federal Election Commission; 2020–present	Incumbent
Preceded by James E. Trainor III	Chair of the Federal Election Commission; 2021	Succeeded by Allen Dickerson
