= Caroline C. Hunter =

American government official (born 1971)

Caroline Hunter
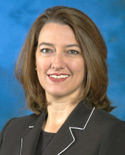

Chair of the Federal Election Commission
- In office January 1, 2020 – June 18, 2020
- President: Donald Trump
- Preceded by: Ellen Weintraub
- Succeeded by: James E. Trainor III
- In office January 1, 2018 – December 31, 2018
- President: Donald Trump
- Preceded by: Steven T. Walther
- Succeeded by: Ellen Weintraub
- In office January 1, 2012 – December 31, 2012
- President: Barack Obama
- Preceded by: Cynthia L. Bauerly
- Succeeded by: Ellen Weintraub

Member of the Federal Election Commission
- In office June 24, 2008 – July 3, 2020
- President: George W. Bush; Barack Obama; Donald Trump
- Preceded by: Michael E. Toner
- Succeeded by: Allen Dickerson

Personal details
- Born: c. 1971 (age 54–55) Boca Raton, Florida, U.S.
- Party: Republican
- Spouse: Justin Hunter
- Children: 2
- Education: Pennsylvania State University (BA); University of Memphis (JD)

Caroline Critchfield Hunter (born c. 1971) is a former Republican member of the United States Federal Election Commission (FEC). She was appointed in June 2008, and served as chair in 2012, 2018, and 2020. On June 26, 2020, she resigned from the FEC, effective July 3, 2020, leaving the FEC without a quorum.

== Education ==
Hunter graduated cum laude from the University of Memphis School of Law and received her bachelor of arts degree from The Pennsylvania State University.

== Career ==
From 2001 to 2005 she was associate counsel and then deputy counsel at the Republican National Committee where she provided guidance on Election Law and the implementation of the Help America Vote Act of 2002. From 2005 to 2006, she was Citizenship and Immigration Services Ombudsman within the U.S. Department of Homeland Security. Hunter also served as deputy director of the White House Office of Public Liaison from January to October 2006. Hunter was nominated to the Election Assistance Commission in 2006 and confirmed by the U.S. Senate on February 15, 2007. She served as the vice chair of the EAC. She was nominated to the Federal Election Commission by President George W. Bush on May 6, 2008. Her appointment was approved by the United States Senate on June 24, 2008.

As President Donald Trump was being investigated by Congress for allegedly soliciting dirt on a political opponent from a foreign country in exchange for military aid, the then-Chair of the FEC, Ellen Weintraub, published a "Draft Interpretive Rule Concerning Prohibited Activities Involving Foreign Nationals" on the FEC website. According to Weintraub, Hunter objected to the inclusion of the draft in the FEC's public weekly digest of its actions, and blocked the publication of the weekly digest as a result, a move that Weintraub described as "altogether unprecedented".

== Personal life ==
She lives in Washington, D.C., with her husband and two daughters.
