= Bradley Smith (law professor) =

American political scientist (born 1958)

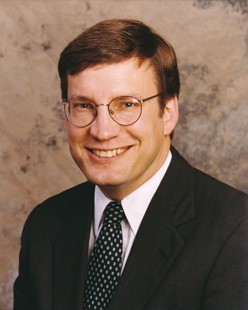
- Official portrait, c. 2001

Chair of the Federal Election Commission
- In office January 2, 2004 – December 31, 2004
- President: George W. Bush
- Preceded by: Ellen Weintraub
- Succeeded by: Scott E. Thomas

Member of the Federal Election Commission
- In office June 26, 2000 – August 21, 2005
- Nominated by: Bill Clinton
- Preceded by: Lee Ann Elliott
- Succeeded by: Hans von Spakovsky

Personal details
- Born: Bradley Alan Smith; 1958 (age 67–68)
- Party: Republican
- Education: Kalamazoo College (BA); Harvard University (JD)
- Occupation: Law professor

Bradley Alan Smith (born 1958) is the Josiah H. Blackmore II/Shirley M. Nault Professor at Capital University Law School in Columbus, Ohio. He served as commissioner, vice chairman, and chairman of the Federal Election Commission (FEC) between 2000 and 2005. He has held prior visiting appointments at Princeton University and West Virginia University. Smith is best known for his writing and activities on campaign finance deregulation. He founded the Center for Competitive Politics, now known as the Institute for Free Speech, to promote deregulation of campaign finance.

== Career ==
=== Academia ===
Smith received a B.A. from Kalamazoo College and a J.D. from Harvard Law School in 1990. After practicing law with the Columbus, Ohio-based law firm of Vorys, Sater, Seymour and Pease, Smith joined the faculty at Capital University Law School in Columbus in 1993.

In 1996, Smith published "Faulty Assumptions and Undemocratic Consequences of Campaign Finance Reform" in the Yale Law Journal. In "Faulty Assumptions", Smith set forth a case against campaign finance regulation, arguing that efforts to regulate money in politics had been based on a series of incorrect beliefs about the effects of money in politics and that as a result reform efforts had failed to accomplish their objectives and had made many of the problems of money in politics worse. "Faulty Assumptions," and later articles by Smith, have been cited in numerous recent Supreme Court decisions striking down campaign finance laws on Constitutional grounds, including Citizens United v. Federal Election Commission. In 2010, The New York Times called Smith the "intellectual powerhouse" behind the movement to deregulate campaign finance. Smith followed "Faulty Assumptions" with a series of academic articles, including "Money Talks: Speech, Corruption, Equality and Campaign Finance", which focuses on Constitutional principles of campaign finance regulation.

Smith published a monograph on campaign finance, titled Unfree Speech: The Folly of Campaign Finance Reform, in 2001. Writer Eliza Newlin Carney called it a "reasonably lively read" and deemed his First Amendment defense of "issue-advocacy messages by interest groups" to be convincing, but she wrote that his other arguments for campaign finance deregulation lack credibility and are too dismissive of the risk of corruption. Law professor J. Clark Kelso described the book as a "provocative work", and concluded that "Smith’s work is at its weakest in suggesting that large campaign contributions do not generate corruption or the appearance of corruption in political processes, and at its strongest in criticizing campaign finance regulation’s failure to live up to its promises and to solve the problem of corruption in a meaningful way".

Reviewing the whole of Smith's work, legal historian Ann Southworth wrote in her 2024 book, "Big Money Unleashed," "Smith has done more than any other scholar since the 1970s to advance the legal theories that ultimately prevailed in the Roberts Court."

== Federal Election Commission ==
By the late 1990s, Smith had become a recurring witness before congressional panels on election matters. He was nominated to a six-year term in a Republican-designated seat on the FEC on February 9, 2000, by then-President Bill Clinton and confirmed by the United States Senate. By this time, Smith was considered a leading expert on campaign finance in the United States, with his writings on campaign finance and election issues having appeared in academic publications in addition to the Yale Law Journal, including the University of Pennsylvania Law Review and the Harvard Journal of Legislation. The Brennan Center for Justice, a harsh critic of Smith's work, nevertheless recognized him as Congress's "most sought after witness" to make the case for deregulation of campaign finance.

Because of his contrarian, deregulatory views on campaign finance, there was a strong objection to his nomination from reform advocates. A favorable profile in the libertarian magazine Reason noted that virtually all reform advocates "agreed that he was the wrong person for the job". His nomination, however, received encouragement from supporters of campaign finance deregulation, such as the Cato Institute.

As commissioner and, later, chairman of the FEC, Smith remained controversial, particularly in 2004, when, as chairman, he bucked the Republican Party and refused to support new regulations of "527 groups", organizations largely unregulated by campaign finance laws, that were generally believed to favour Democratic presidential candidate John Kerry. As commissioner, he maintained an active speaking schedule and continued to criticize campaign finance laws. He resigned from the FEC in August 2005 to return to teaching, writing in his resignation letter to President Bush, "Political activity is more heavily regulated than at any time in our nation's history."

== Non-profit work ==
After leaving the FEC, Smith returned to teaching at Capital University and founded a non-profit organization, the Center for Competitive Politics to promote deregulation of campaign finance. In 2017, the center changed its name to the Institute for Free Speech. Smith served as a senior fellow at the Goldwater Institute, a member of the Board of Scholars at the Mackinac Center for Public Policy, a member of the board of trustees of the Buckeye Institute, and a member of the Editorial Advisory Board of the Harvard Journal of Law and Public Policy. He also sat on the advisory board of the Institute for Law and Politics at the University of Minnesota Law School and serves on the editorial advisory board of the Election Law Journal. In 2007–08, he was an adviser on the Constitution and the Courts for the presidential campaign of Mitt Romney.

"Unfree Speech" was cited in the Supreme Court's majority opinion in Citizens United v. Federal Election Commission, which held that corporations have a right to spend money in candidate elections. Smith's organization, the Center for Competitive Politics, was co-counsel for plaintiffs in SpeechNow.org v. Federal Election Commission, a 2010 Court of Appeals case that created Super PACs. In 2012, Commentary called him "the single most important voice in the fight to roll back restrictions on political speech." In May 2010, he was announced as one of four winners of the year's Bradley Prize, awarded annually by the conservative Lynde & Harry Bradley Foundation of Milwaukee, Wisconsin, "to innovative thinkers and practitioners whose achievements strengthen the legacy of the Bradley brothers."

Smith is a board member for American Edge, a lobbying group for the technology industry.

== Other post-FEC career activities ==
In 2024, President Donald Trump retained Smith as an expert witness in his hush money trial. Smith ended up not testifying as Trump’s legal team chose not to call on him in light of restrictions placed on his testimony by Judge Juan Merchan. Trump repeatedly said that Smith "was not allowed to" testify.
