= Dark Money (film) =

- Theatrical release poster
- Directed by: Kimberly Reed
- Written by: Kimberly Reed; Jay Arthur Sterrenberg
- Produced by: Kimberly Reed; Katy Chevigny
- Cinematography: Kimberly Reed; Eric Phillips-Horst; Jay Arthur Sterrenberg
- Edited by: Jay Arthur Sterrenberg
- Production company: Big Sky Film Productions
- Distributed by: PBS
- Release dates: January 22, 2018 (Sundance); October 1, 2018 (United States)
- Running time: 98 minutes
- Country: United States
- Language: English

Dark Money is a 2018 American documentary film directed by Kimberly Reed about the effects of corporate money and influence in the American political system. The film uses Reed's home state of Montana as a primary case study to advance a broader, national discussion on governance in an era of super PACs and Citizens United. Dark Money premiered at the 2018 Sundance Film Festival and premiered to a Montana audience at the Big Sky Film Festival in February 2018. The broadcast rights to Dark Money were purchased by PBS distribution to air the film as part of their docu-series POV in 2018.

== Synopsis ==
Dark Money tracks the influence of corporate money in contemporary American politics. Using the state of Montana as a primary case study, the film engages with the complex history that Montana state politics has with corporate influence in politics. Starting with the story of the Anaconda Copper Mining Company, Dark Money shows how the influence of mining corporations caused state legislators to relax mining regulations, which resulted in an environmental catastrophe in Butte, Montana, with problems that persist today. As a result, Montana banned corporate campaign financing of state politics in 1912. However, since the Citizens United v. FEC Supreme Court decision, corporate interests and big money have made their way back on the scene in Montana and have become a growing national concern. The film traces the steps taken by Montana Attorney General (and later Governor) Steve Bullock to seek relief from campaign finance abuses at a time when the Federal Election Commission (FEC) was ground to a halt by the appointment of three new Republican members, headed by Don McGahn, who systemically blocked all enforcement of FEC regulations. In 2015, Montana reasserted its campaign finance sovereignty with passage of the Montana Disclose Act, which, by requiring full disclosure of contributors' names, removed the "dark" aspect of the Big Money influence on their campaigns. John S. Adams of the Montana Free Press plays a central role in the film as an investigative journalist who has been tracking state politics and "following the money" for several years. Adams has reported on everything from the role of the American Tradition Partnership (formerly known as Western Tradition Partnership) funds in the shaping of state election laws to the illegal political activities of a "right to work" PAC in Montana as well. The film follows Adams's work as a reporter, but it also includes interviews from other prominent figures in Montana state politics and those involved in the movement to examine and limit the influence of dark money in politics.

Director Kimberly Reed explains that she was motivated to make the film because the way to understand any public issue is to understand what guides it. “The first thing you have to look at is the money that’s fueling that issue,” she explains. “Just by following that money, you can tell a lot about the powers-that-be behind it.”

== Reception ==
Deadline Hollywood covered the film in anticipation of the Sundance Film Festival, describing it as "controversial," and pointing out that, "The film follows an investigative reporter on the trail of a major legal case in Montana which all ties back to ‘dark money’ political ad campaign spending that no one is privy to where the funding is coming from. The documentary reveals how this practice is devastating elections throughout the country."

Variety's review of the film assessed it as a "microcosm of the troubling impact of the Citizens United ruling on U.S. democracy." The review also states that, "Reed’s sophomore feature is straightforward reportage, telling a complex, multi-issue story with a large number of players, in admirably cogent terms."

== Festivals and awards ==
Dark Money was part of the 2016 "Good Pitch" program, designed to develop documentaries on leading social issues with input from NGOs as well as political and social organizations. Dark Money premiered in January 2018 at the Sundance Film Festival, where it was an official selection and won the Producing Award. Dark Money was the opening night film for the Big Sky Documentary Film Festival in February 2018, and won the Best Documentary Award at the Omaha Film Festival in March 2018. The film has screened or is scheduled to screen at several film festivals leading up to the October 1 broadcast and streaming premiere on PBS. These include the FREEP Film Festival, Denver Film Society Women + Film Festival, the Boulder International Film Festival, and the Full Frame Documentary Film Festival.

== See also ==
- 501(c)4
- OpenSecrets
- Western Tradition Partnership, Inc. v. Montana
- James C. Nelson
- Ann M. Ravel
- Ellen L. Weintraub
- Mike Wheat
- Art Wittich
