= WinRed =

American political fundraising platform

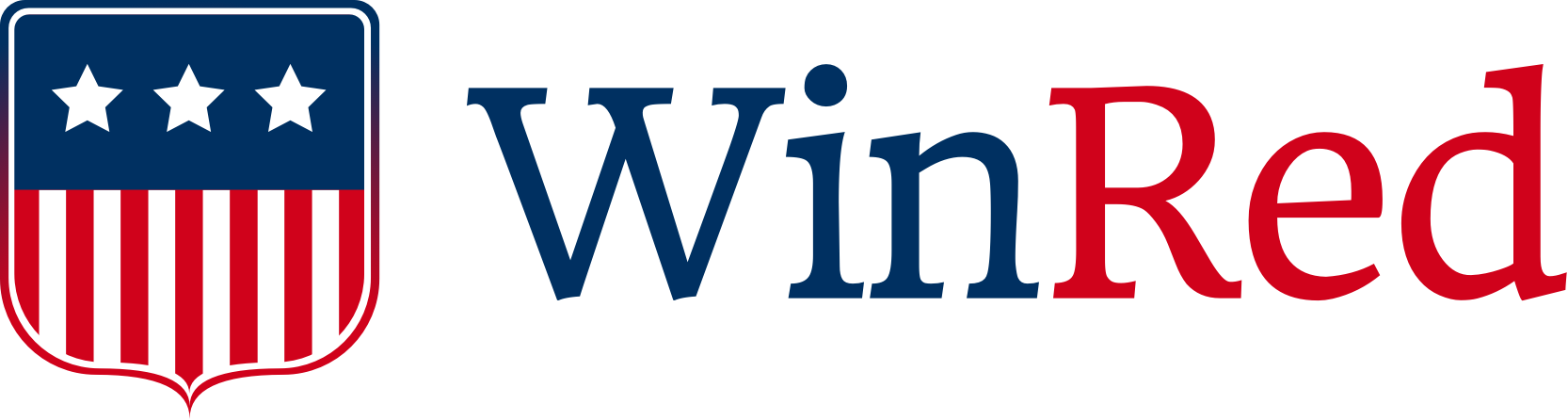
- Formation: 2019; 7 years ago
- Type: For-profit fundraising platform
- Location: Arlington, VA
- Key people: Gerrit Lansing
- Affiliations: Republican Party
- Website: winred.com

WinRed is an American fundraising platform for the Republican Party endorsed by the Republican National Committee (RNC). Launched in 2019, it serves as a conduit for processing online political contributions for Republican candidates and committees. As of 2025, it has processed billions of dollars in donations across federal, state, and local campaigns.

WinRed was launched to compete with the Democratic Party's success in online grassroots fundraising through its platform ActBlue. In contrast to ActBlue, which is run independently of the Democratic Party, WinRed is controlled by the Republican Party. During the 2024 election, WinRed processed $1.8 billion in donations from 4.5 million small-dollar donors.

According to the Federal Election Committee, WinRed processed $5.6 billion in contributions from 8.8 million donors across three election cycles. As of 2025, the platform is used by major Republican committees, including the RNC, NRSC, NRCC, and RSLC, as well as thousands of federal and state campaigns.

== History ==
WinRed is a for-profit fundraising platform built for the American Republican Party. The WinRed launch was the first time the GOP had a single website for all of its candidates.

Republican leadership began discussing the possibility of building a competitor to ActBlue within days of the 2018 midterm results. Donald Trump, his son-in-law Jared Kushner, and Trump's campaign manager at the time, Brad Parscale, were all personally involved in creating the platform. One of the goals of creating WinRed was to unify the party around a single platform to help shrink the G.O.P. fund-raising gap with ActBlue.

WinRed's launch followed months of planning by Republican officials, campaign operatives, and donors, who viewed a unified fundraising platform as important to expanding the party's small-dollar donor base.

According to Politico, Trump participated in naming the platform, suggesting names including 'ActRed' and 'WinRed' during meetings with political aides and allies such as House Minority Leader Kevin McCarthy. WinRed was initially announced as Patriot Pass, with an expected release date of February 2019. The name was changed following Robert Kraft's complaints that the name resembled that of his football team, the New England Patriots. The Republican Party, the Trump re-election campaign, and other state-wide and local races across the United States began using the platform in late 2019, along with more than 140 House campaigns, 46 Senate campaigns, and 45 state parties. Early adopters of WinRed include Trump's reelection campaign, the Republican National Committee, the National Republican Senatorial Committee and the National Republican Congressional Committee. Nearly 800 campaigns used it by May 2020. The creation of WinRed was intended to consolidate Republican online fundraising activities that had previously been spread across multiple vendors. WinRed discloses donor information to the Federal Election Commission.

WinRed merged Revv, a Republican payment processing firm founded in December 2014 by Gerrit Lansing, and DataTrust, the party's voter data repository. Data Trust helped to connect the platform with the party's broader voter data and digital infrastructure. The platform allows one-click donations.

At the time of WinRed's launch, Trump publicly endorsed the platform on Twitter, a move intended to encourage its adoption among Republican campaigns and donors. In April 2020, the platform expanded from its previous representation of only federal-level candidates and began supporting state- and local-level races.

Republican Party committees and the Trump campaign were among the first users of WinRed, and it was subsequently made available to Republican candidates at all levels of government. Party officials have said that no one will be required to use it.

In 2020, Republican candidates raised more than $275 million on WinRed, with $142 million raised in June. By this time, more than 90% of Republican House and Senate members were on the platform, and over 1,300 campaigns used it to raise money.

In 2021, Trump's political operation moved its merchandise and fundraising activities to WinRed as part of efforts to rebuild its small-dollar fundraising infrastructure. It runs the largest merchandise store through WinRed's platform. By 2026, WinRed reported that campaigns using its e-commerce platform had sold more than $250 million in merchandise since the launch of its Zero-Touch Merchandise system in 2019. WinRed also said that the average donation tied to a merchandise purchase is about 32 percent higher than a typical online contribution.

== Organization ==
WinRed is an online fundraising platform used by Republican candidates, campaigns, and committees.

Groups that use WinRed pay a 3.2% credit card processing fee for donations over $500, and 3.94% for all other donation amounts.

== Federal Election Commission reporting ==
WinRed reports all contributions processed to federal campaigns to the Federal Election Commission. When a candidate for a federal election raises money through WinRed, WinRed serves as a conduit for election law purposes. When donations pass through a conduit such as WinRed or ActBlue donors names and contributions are itemized, reported, and made publicly available on the Internet.

By contrast, small donations of up to $200 are not automatically reported to the FEC if they contributed directly to a federal campaign committee.

In 2024, the Institute for Free Speech sued the FEC over a discrepancy whereby small donors utilizing conduits WinRed or ActBlue are automatically made public, but same-sized direct donations are not.

== Fundraising ==
WinRed took in US$30 million in its first three months after launch, $100 million in its first six, and $130 million in the first quarter of 2020. (For comparison, ActBlue brought in $141 million in April 2020, compared to $60 million for WinRed.)

Donald Trump was the largest beneficiary, with six senators raising at least $1 million each. Lansing, as well as various Republican operatives, attributed some of this success to the effort to impeach Trump at the time. On the day after Trump's first impeachment was announced, the Trump campaign and the RNC received over $5 million. Lansing reported that Trump had received 52% of overall donations as of May 2020.

WinRed raised over $2 billion over its first 15 months.

There were nearly 31.2 million donations made on WinRed during the 2022 federal elections, worth nearly $1.2 billion.

According to the Federal Election Commission, WinRed processed $1.8 billion in contributions from 4.5 million donors during the 2024 election cycle.

WinRed is used by President Trump’s 2020 and 2024 campaigns, every 2024 GOP Presidential candidate, major national committees including RNC, NRSC, NRCC, and RSLC, all Republican Senators, 97% of Republican House members, and over 7,000 candidates at all levels.

In 2025, WinRed raised almost $470 million.

== Competitors ==
As part of party negotiations to launch WinRed, the Victory Pass platform was expected to close. The nonpartisan platform Anedot was not involved in discussions among party leadership.

The first Trump administration sent a cease-and-desist letter to WinRed's rival Anedot. The Republican State Leadership Committee, which oversees the ".gop" top-level internet domain, revoked the domain registration of the "Give.GOP" website, which re-branded and re-launched in July 2019 as "Right.us". The national Republican party has said it will limit national party committee investments and data to federal candidates and state parties who use WinRed.

== Criticism ==
Following the 2020 campaign, several Trump donors reported being unknowingly billed for recurring contributions to his campaign. The refund patterns were attributed to how campaigns configured WinRed's platform. WinRed's documentation confirms campaigns can choose to "Pre-Select" recurring donations or set "No Default" where donors must actively opt in. In addition, WinRed keeps the fees it charges on each refunded contribution. After the release of that report, the National Republican Congressional Committee continued to use the same tactics in their fundraising on WinRed.

In 2022, a judge authorized the continuation of an investigation by several state attorneys general into WinRed's fundraising practices.

In 2022 and 2023, some organizations and newspapers have questioned WinRed's finances and fee structure. The Campaign Legal Center challenged the platform's expense disclosures, while The New York Times reported internal discussions about increasing transaction fees amid a decline in fundraising revenue.

In 2023, O'Keefe Media Group published allegations concerning the accuracy of certain donor records reported through federal campaign-finance disclosures.
