= Ellen Weintraub =

Member of the United States Federal Election Commission

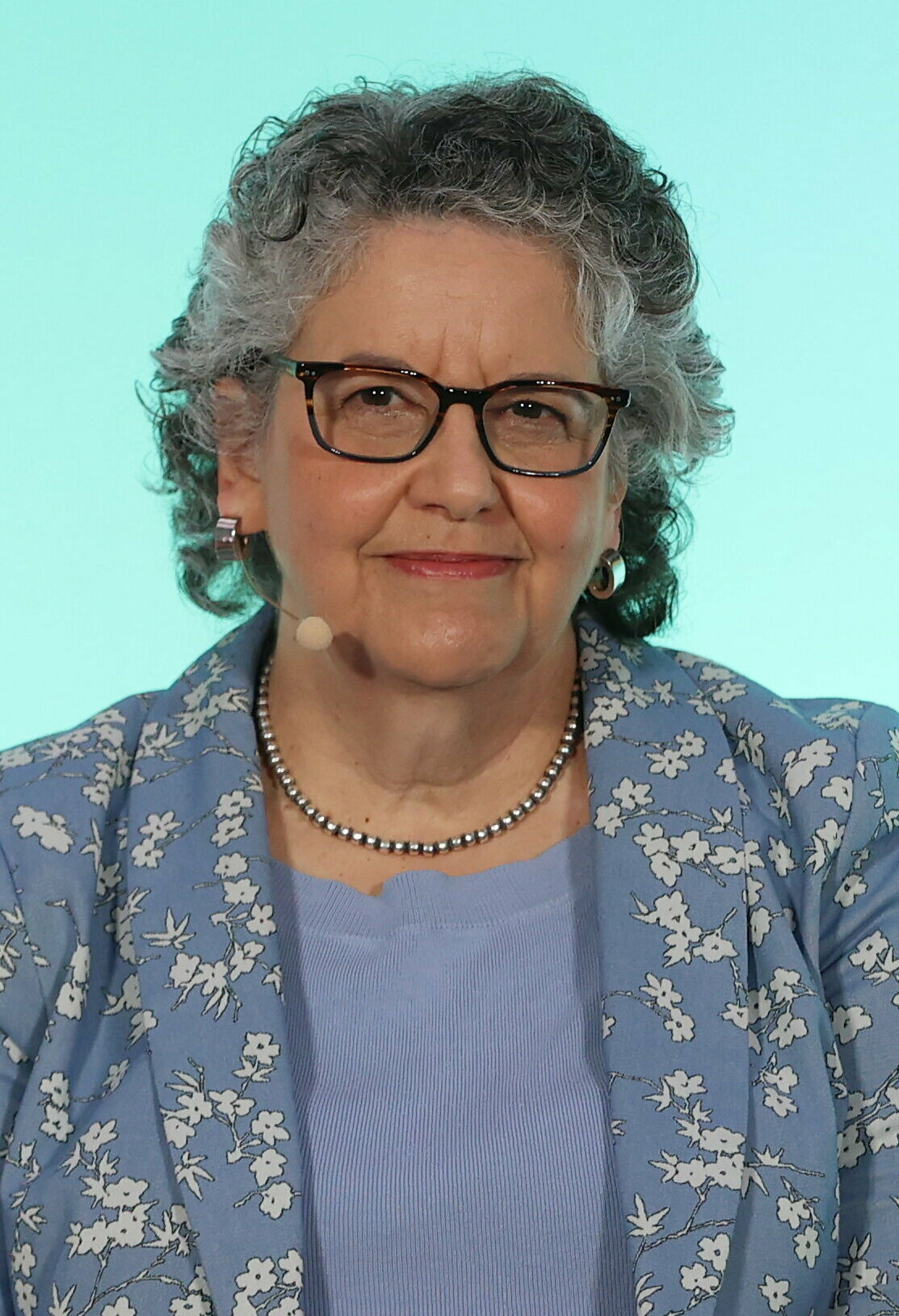
- Weintraub in 2023

Chair of the Federal Election Commission
- In office January 1, 2025 – February 6, 2025 (Note: disputed since February 6, 2025)
- President: Joe Biden; Donald Trump
- Preceded by: Sean J. Cooksey
- Succeeded by: Shana M. Broussard
- In office January 1, 2019 – December 31, 2019
- President: Donald Trump
- Preceded by: Caroline C. Hunter
- Succeeded by: Caroline C. Hunter
- In office January 1, 2013 – December 31, 2013
- President: Barack Obama
- Preceded by: Caroline C. Hunter
- Succeeded by: Lee E. Goodman
- In office January 1, 2003 – December 31, 2003
- President: George W. Bush
- Preceded by: David M. Mason
- Succeeded by: Bradley Smith

Commissioner of the Federal Election Commission
- In office December 9, 2002 – February 6, 2025 (Note: disputed since February 6, 2025)
- President: George W. Bush; Barack Obama; Donald Trump; Joe Biden; Donald Trump
- Preceded by: Karl Sandstrom
- Succeeded by: vacant

Personal details
- Born: 1957 (age 68–69) New York City, U.S.
- Party: Democratic
- Spouse: Bill Dauster
- Education: Yale University (BA); Harvard University (JD)

Ellen L. Weintraub is an American attorney who served as a member of the Federal Election Commission from 2002 to 2025. She served as the commission's chair in 2003, 2013, 2019, and 2025. On February 6, 2025, President Donald Trump sent Weintraub a letter purporting to dismiss her from the Commission; Weintraub has described this dismissal as illegal and asserted her intent to remain in office until a successor is confirmed by the United States Senate.

== Career ==
Ellen Weintraub began her career in private practice as a litigator with the New York firm of Cahill Gordon & Reindel. Weintraub was then counsel to the Committee on Standards of Official Conduct for the U.S. House of Representatives (the House Ethics Committee), where she advised members on investigations. She focused on implementing the Ethics Reform Act of 1989 (Pub. L. 101–194) and subsequent changes to the House Code of Official Conduct. She also served as editor in chief of the House Ethics Manual and as a principal contributor to the Senate Ethics Manual. Weintraub subsequently returned to private practice as counsel at Perkins Coie LLP, where she was a member of its Political Law Group. There, she counseled clients on federal and state campaign finance laws, political ethics, nonprofit law, and lobbying regulation. During the election contest arising out of the 1996 election of Senator Mary Landrieu (D-LA), Weintraub served on the legal team that advised the Senate Rules Committee.

=== Federal Election Commission ===
Weintraub received a recess appointment to the Federal Election Commission on December 6, 2002, and took office on December 9, 2002. She was renominated on January 9, 2003, and confirmed by unanimous consent of the United States Senate on March 18, 2003. Shortly after her arrival at the FEC, Weintraub was elected Chair of the Commission for 2003. She is the third woman to serve on the Commission, following Republicans Lee Ann Elliott and Joan Aikens. In June 2008, two more women, Democrat Cynthia L. Bauerly and Republican Caroline C. Hunter, joined Weintraub on the Commission.

Weintraub has been vocal about the need for strong regulations in campaign finance - especially to curb "soft money" influences and upholding governmental authority to deter corruption in election campaigns.

In July 2013, while Weintraub was serving as Chair, the Commission ruled that legally married same-sex couples must be treated the same as opposite-sex couples under election law.

In March 2016, following the Supreme Court decision on Citizens United v. FEC, Weintraub published an op-ed in the New York Times where she expressed the dangers of foreign national interests - by way of corporations, who most likely have international shareholders - intruding upon American politics via campaigning. She also appeared before Judiciary Committee in February 2020 to testify about Citizens United on campaign finance, opining for regulations on super PACs.

In February 2017, Weintraub called on President Donald Trump to reveal his evidence of voter fraud after the president claimed that it caused him and former Senator Kelly Ayotte to lose in New Hampshire in the 2016 U.S. election. “The scheme the President of the United States alleges would constitute thousands of felony criminal offences under New Hampshire law,” Weintraub said in a statement printed on FEC letterhead. As a result, an organization funded by the Koch brothers, Cause of Action, issued a statement calling for her to be investigated for ethics violations. Weintraub subsequently defended her actions and maintained that the alleged fraud would constitute a violation of federal campaign finance laws, which is germane to her position as a FEC commissioner. After Trump repeated these claims at an August campaign rally in 2019, Weintraub wrote a letter asking Trump to produce evidence of his assertions.

During 2017, Weintraub championed greater disclosure of political ads on the internet, and helped move the FEC to open a rulemaking on the matter with bipartisan support. On December 18, 2018 she was once again elected Chair.

Weintraub's term as Commissioner expired April 30, 2007, but she continues in office until her successor takes office. She is not eligible for reappointment.

Weintraub was elected as chair for a fourth time for 2025.

On February 6, Weintraub posted a copy of a letter from President Donald Trump on X (formerly Twitter) in which Trump informed her that she was removed from the FEC with immediate effect. Commenting "There’s a legal way to replace FEC commissioners-this isn’t it", Weintraub later told reporters that she does not recognize her purported dismissal and intends to remain in office.

== Personal life ==
Weintraub is married to Bill Dauster (former director of policy for Senator Chris Van Hollen and former legislative director for Senator Russ Feingold). She is a Reform Jew.

== See also ==
- Dark Money (film)
