= Michael E. Toner =

American attorney

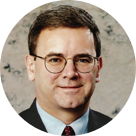

Chairman of the Federal Election Commission
- In office 2006–2006

Commissioner of the Federal Election Commission
- In office 2002–2007

Personal details
- Education: University of Virginia B.A. Johns Hopkins University M.A. Cornell Law School J.D.
- Occupation: Partner at Wiley Rein

Michael E. Toner, American attorney and political appointee, specializes in election law, and is currently employed by Wiley Rein LLP where he co-chairs the Election Law & Government Ethics Practice. He formerly served as the chairman of the Federal Election Commission (FEC), the regulatory body that oversees campaign finance for United States federal elections.

Toner joined Wiley Rein in 2011, after leaving Bryan Cave LLP, where he was a partner for four years, and was also president of Bryan Cave Strategies, which was Bryan Cave's government affairs division. Prior to working at Bryan Cave, Toner served as chairman of the Federal Election Commission in 2006. He was nominated to be an FEC commissioner by President George W. Bush on March 4, 2002, and was given a recess appointment to the FEC on March 29, 2002. The United States Senate confirmed Toner to a full term as Commissioner on March 18, 2003, and he served on the FEC until 2007.

Prior to being appointed to the FEC, Toner was Chief Counsel of the Republican National Committee. He joined the RNC in 2001 after serving as general counsel of the Bush-Cheney Transition Team in Washington, D.C., and general counsel of the Bush-Cheney 2000 presidential campaign in Austin, Texas.

Before joining the Bush campaign in Austin, Toner was Deputy Counsel at the RNC from 1997 to 1999. He previously served as counsel to the Dole/Kemp presidential campaign in 1996.

Chambers USA has continually recognized Toner as a top-tier election law attorney and refers to his experience as "unique and valuable." They say that he "calibrates risk, practicality and the law better than 99% of other outside counsel" (2016); and that "his background of government service gives him great insight into the workings of the Federal Election Commission and the way it thinks" (2014). In 2019, Chambers USA further praised Toner, saying "he continues to co-lead a vibrant Practice Group while being an active author and maintaining high visibility among peers and media" (2019).

Toner is a contributing author on various books including Trumped: The 2016 Election that Broke all the Rules, The Surge, Barack Obama and the New America, Pendulum Swing, The Year of Obama, The Sixth Year Itch, and Divided States of America: The Slash and Burn Politics of the 2004 Presidential Election. He has also published articles in The Washington Post, USA Today, The Boston Globe, The Chicago Tribune, The Washington Times, The Hill, Campaigns and Elections, Roll Call, and Larry Sabato's Crystal Ball.

His insider knowledge of the FEC has made Toner a reputable commentator on CNN, Fox News Channel, ABC News, CBS Evening News, MSNBC, Bloomberg News, Fox Business Network, C-SPAN, BBC, and National Public Radio. In 2016, Toner served as a presidential campaign delegate analyst for CNN.

Toner was an associate attorney at Wiley Rein LLP (formerly Wiley Rein & Fielding LLP) in Washington, D.C., from 1992 to 1996. His work there included advising political committees and corporate clients on federal and state election law compliance. He was also involved in a number of First and Fourteenth Amendment appellate litigation matters, including two cases that were successful in the U.S. Supreme Court.

Toner has been an adjunct professor of law at the William and Mary Law School and a lecturer in the department of politics at the University of Virginia.

He is a member of the District of Columbia Bar and Virginia Bar Association, as well as the United States Supreme Court Bar. He is also admitted to appear before the Fourth U.S. Circuit Court of Appeals and the U.S. District Courts for the District of Columbia and Eastern District of Virginia.

Toner received a J.D., cum laude, from Cornell Law School in 1992, an M.A. in political science from Johns Hopkins University in 1989, and a B.A., with distinction, from the University of Virginia in 1986.
