= Sean J. Cooksey =

American attorney and political advisor

Sean Cooksey

Counsel to the Vice President
- In office January 20, 2025 – February 13, 2026
- President: Donald Trump
- Vice President: JD Vance
- Preceded by: Erica Songer
- Succeeded by: Vetan Kapoor

Chairman of the Federal Election Commission
- In office January 1, 2024 – December 31, 2024
- President: Joe Biden
- Preceded by: Dara Lindenbaum
- Succeeded by: Ellen Weintraub

Commissioner of the Federal Election Commission
- In office December 14, 2020 – January 20, 2025
- President: Donald Trump; Joe Biden
- Preceded by: Lee E. Goodman
- Succeeded by: Vacant

Personal details
- Born: Sean Joseph Cooksey; May 4, 1989 (age 37)
- Party: Republican
- Education: Truman State University (BA); University of Chicago (JD)

Sean Joseph Cooksey is an American attorney and political advisor who served as counsel to the Vice President of the United States, JD Vance, from January 2025 to February 2026. He previously served as both Commissioner and Chairman of the Federal Election Commission.

== Education ==
Cooksey received his Bachelor of Arts, summa cum laude, from Truman State University and his J.D. degree from the University of Chicago Law School in 2014, where he graduated with High Honors and Order of the Coif, and served as a Managing Editor on the University of Chicago Law Review.

== Career ==
=== Legal career ===
Cooksey served as a law clerk for Judge Jerry Edwin Smith of the United States Court of Appeals for the Fifth Circuit. He then worked as a litigation associate at Gibson, Dunn & Crutcher in Washington, D.C. where his practice focused on appeals and constitutional law. He later served as Deputy Chief Counsel for Senator Ted Cruz of Texas. He then served as General Counsel to Senator Josh Hawley of Missouri. He advised the Senator on issues including constitutional law, judicial nominations, election law, federal criminal law, and ethics compliance, and served as the Senator's lead staffer on the U.S. Senate Committee on the Judiciary.

=== Federal Election Commission ===
On October 28, 2020, President Donald Trump announced his intent to nominate Cooksey to serve as a Commissioner of the Federal Election Commission. On October 30, 2020, his nomination was sent to the Senate. He was nominated to the vacancy created by the retirement of Lee E. Goodman on February 16, 2018. On December 9, 2020, he was confirmed by the Senate by a vote of 50–46.

He was sworn in on December 14, 2020, making him the youngest commissioner in FEC history. In December 2022, Dara Lindenbaum was elected Chair of the Federal Election Commission, and Sean J. Cooksey was elected Vice Chairman for 2023. He was later elected Chairman for 2024.

As a Commissioner, Cooksey has called for the repeal of election regulations. He has also criticized the agency’s failure to comply with requests under the Freedom of Information Act, leading to multiple court settlements.

Cooksey has advocated for expanding the Commission’s regulatory exemption for press and media activities. In Commission statements, Cooksey argued against regulating media companies on the internet. He has also argued against regulating media-hosted candidate debates, media entities owned by federal candidates, or the media appearances of candidates.

Cooksey has also opposed regulation of political speech and activities on the internet, and he has defended the Federal Election Commission’s regulatory exemption for internet-based political activities. In 2021, he supported broad exemptions for social media companies to host and moderate political speech on their platforms regardless of political motivation. In 2022, he criticized proposals for broader internet disclaimer regulations by the Federal Election Commission, which the Commission ultimately scaled back.

In testimony before the United States House Committee on House Administration, Cooksey defended the Commission’s agency structure from criticism that it causes deadlock or inefficiency, and he argued that the Commission reaches some kind of bipartisan agreement in 90 percent of enforcement matters.

Cooksey resigned from the FEC in January 2025.

=== Office of the Vice President ===
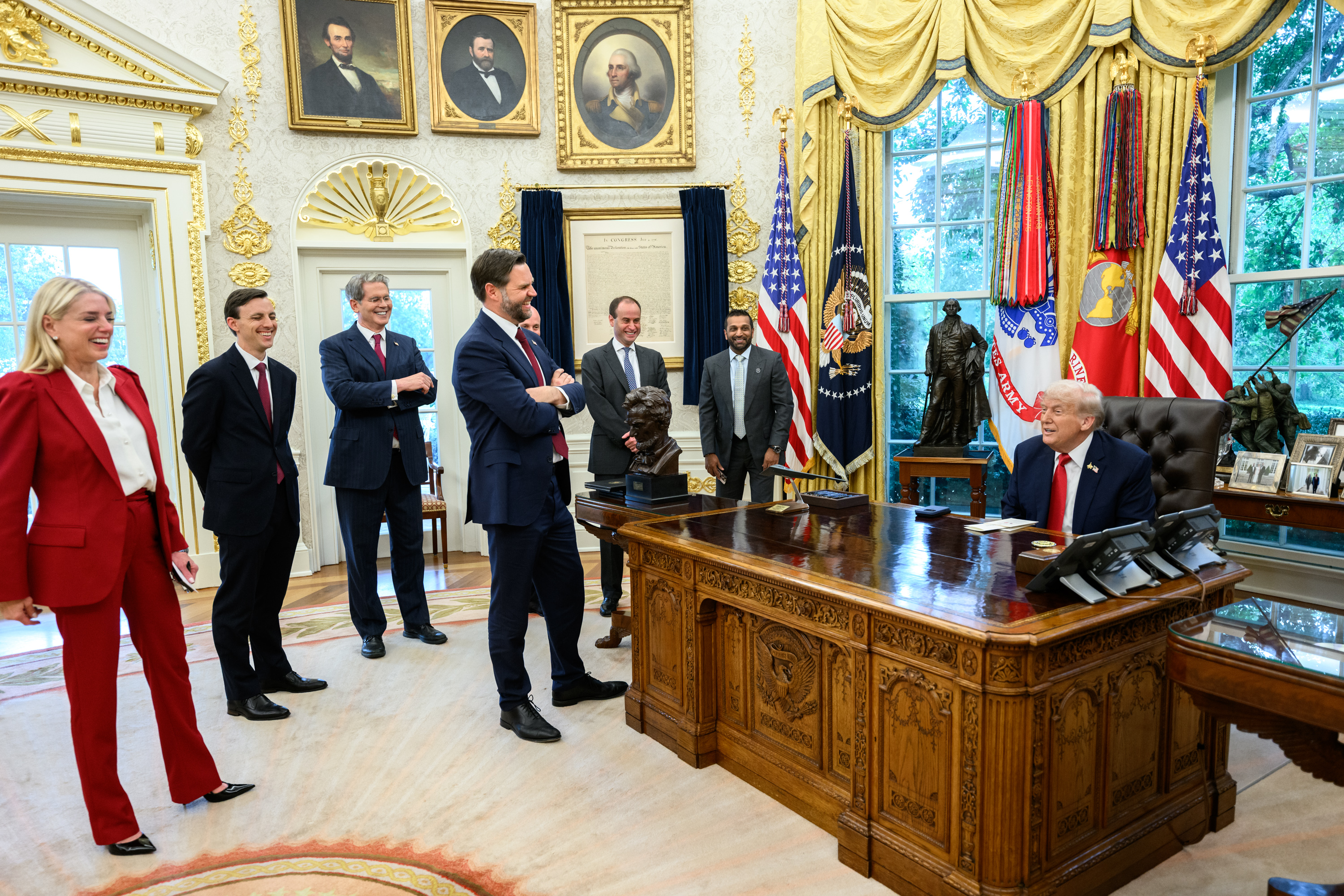
Cooksey (second left) meeting President Donald Trump along with Vice President JD Vance, Secretary Scott Bessent, Attorney General Pam Bondi, and others, in the Oval Office in 2025

At the beginning of the second presidency of Donald Trump, Cooksey joined the administration as Counsel to Vice President JD Vance, serving as the Vice President's chief legal adviser. In that role, Cooksey was directly involved in the negotiations and crafting of Trump Administration policies to lift legal restrictions on TikTok in the United States.

== Personal life ==
Cooksey is a Republican. He is a practicing Roman Catholic.

Legal offices
Preceded by Lee E. Goodman	Commissioner of the Federal Election Commission; 2020–2025	Vacant
Preceded by Dara Lindenbaum	Chair of the Federal Election Commission; 2024	Succeeded by Ellen Weintraub
