= Matthew S. Petersen =

American attorney (born 1970)

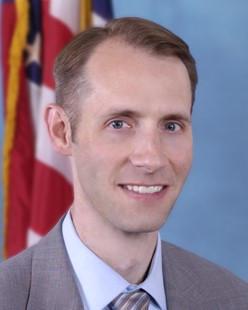

Chair of the Federal Election Commission
- In office January 1, 2016 – December 31, 2016
- President: Barack Obama
- Preceded by: Ann M. Ravel
- Succeeded by: Steven T. Walther
- In office January 1, 2010 – December 31, 2010
- President: Barack Obama
- Preceded by: Steven T. Walther
- Succeeded by: Cynthia L. Bauerly

Member of the Federal Election Commission
- In office June 24, 2008 – August 31, 2019
- President: George W. Bush; Barack Obama; Donald Trump
- Preceded by: Hans von Spakovsky
- Succeeded by: James E. Trainor III

Personal details
- Born: 1970 (age 55–56) Torrance, California, U.S.
- Party: Republican
- Education: Utah Valley University (AS); Brigham Young University (BA); University of Virginia (JD)

Matthew Spencer Petersen (born 1970) is an American attorney who served as a member of the United States Federal Election Commission. In 2017, he was nominated by President Donald Trump to be a United States district judge of the United States District Court for the District of Columbia. Petersen withdrew his nomination following an exchange with Senator John Kennedy during his confirmation hearing. On August 26, 2019, Petersen announced his resignation from the FEC, effective August 31. In September 2019, Petersen joined the law firm Holtzman Vogel Josefiak Torchinsky as a partner where he practices political law.

== Early life and education ==
Petersen was born in Torrance, California and raised in Mapleton, Utah. He received an associate degree with high honors from Utah Valley State College in 1993, then went on to graduate magna cum laude with a Bachelor of Arts in philosophy from Brigham Young University in 1996. Petersen received his Juris Doctor in 1999 from the University of Virginia School of Law, where he was a member of the Virginia Law Review.

== Career ==
From 1999 to 2002, he practiced election and campaign finance law at Wiley Rein in Washington, D.C.

From 2002 to 2008, Petersen served in senior staff positions in both houses of Congress. From 2002 to 2005, he served as counsel to the United States House Committee on House Administration. During his tenure, he was involved in crafting the Help America Vote Act of 2002 and the House-Senate negotiations that culminated in the bill's ultimate passage.

From 2005 to 2008, he served as Republican chief counsel to the United States Senate Committee on Rules and Administration. He was chief adviser to the Republican floor manager during the Senate debate on the Honest Leadership and Open Government Act of 2007, the most recent comprehensive revision of federal lobbying and government ethics laws.

=== Federal Election Commission ===
Petersen was nominated to the Federal Election Commission by President George W. Bush on June 12, 2008, and unanimously confirmed by the United States Senate on June 24, 2008. He served as Chairman in 2010 and 2016. On December 18, 2018, he was elected Vice-Chair. On August 26, 2019, he announced his resignation, effective August 31.

Early in Petersen's tenure, the Supreme Court of the United States held in Citizens United v. FEC that the federal prohibition against corporations and labor unions making independent expenditures in connection with elections violated the free speech clause of the First Amendment. In the aftermath of that landmark opinion, Petersen and his FEC colleagues developed the legal framework that led to the advent of Super PACs and governed political speech by corporations and labor unions. He also helped draft more robust procedural protections for persons and groups involved in enforcement matters, audits, and advisory opinions.

As a Commissioner, Petersen advocated for maintaining broad protections for internet political speech. According to Petersen, the "use of the internet as a tool for political engagement has had a democratizing effect[,] … enabl[ing] speakers with few resources to communicate to large audiences, while a seemingly infinite array of [online] resources aid the citizenry in casting informed votes."

During Petersen’s time on the FEC, some campaign finance reform groups criticized FEC Republicans for not being aggressive enough in enforcing campaign spending restrictions. Others praised the Republicans for their commitment to free speech and principled decision making.

On August 26, 2019, Petersen sent a letter to President Donald J. Trump announcing he would be stepping down from the FEC. In his resignation letter, Petersen said, "I have faithfully discharged my duty to enforce the law in a manner that respects free speech rights, while also fairly interpreting the relevant statutes and regulations and providing meaningful notice to those subject to FEC jurisdiction." Petersen's departure from the FEC left the agency with only three commissioners; a minimum of four commissioners is necessary for the FEC to vote on enforcement actions, regulations, and advisory opinions.

=== Post-FEC ===
On September 5, 2019, the law firm of Holtzman Vogel Josefiak Torchinsky announced that Petersen would join as a partner. Petersen’s practice focuses on campaign finance, election administration, lobbying compliance, and government ethics. Petersen continues to write about and comment on election law-related issues, including the election administration challenges caused by COVID-19, and serves on the board of the Republican National Lawyers Association.

=== Failed nomination to district court ===
External videos
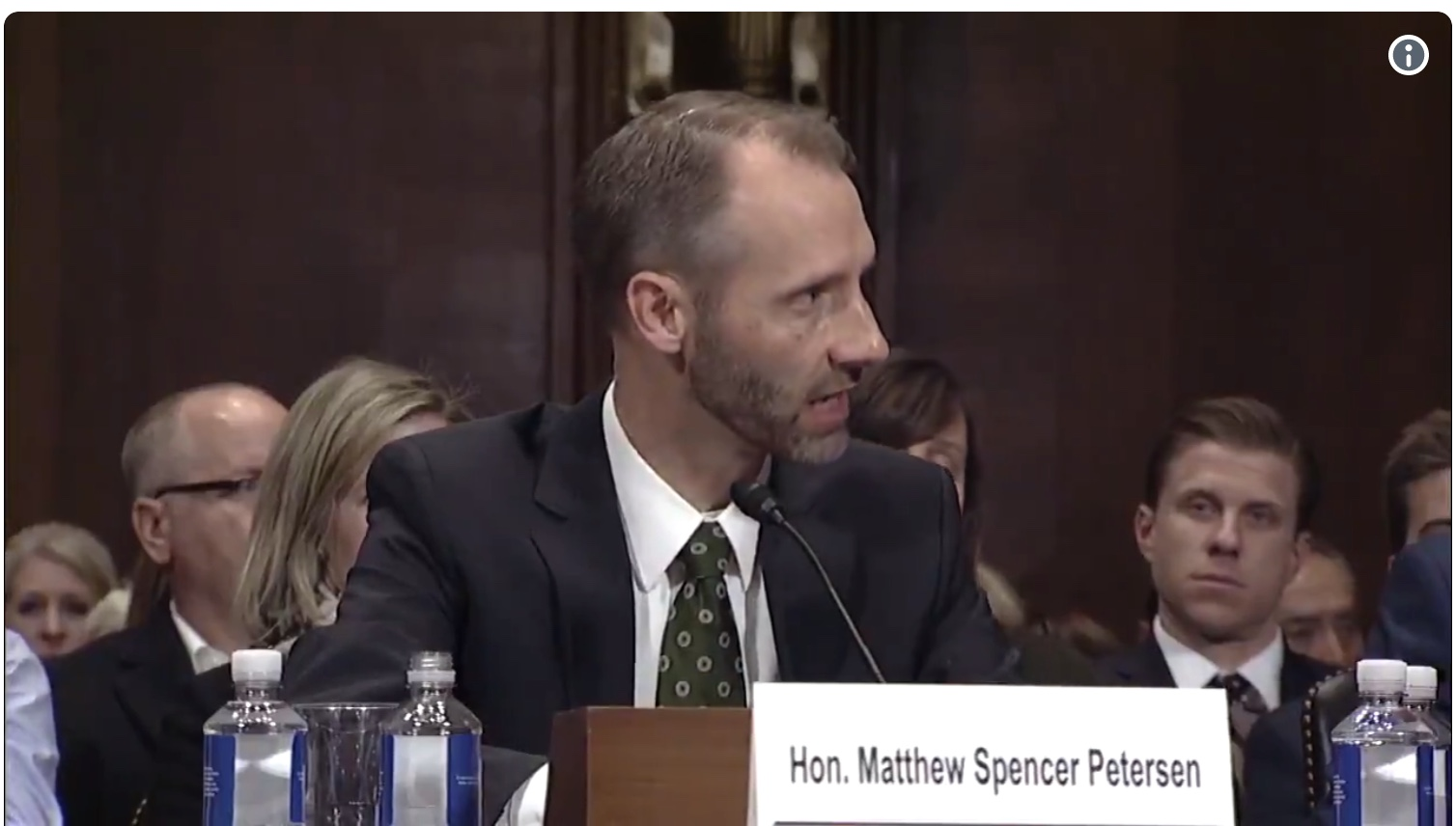
- "Video Shows Trump Judicial Nominee Unable To Answer Basic Questions Of Law". NPR

On September 11, 2017, President Donald Trump nominated Petersen to serve as a United States District Judge of the United States District Court for the District of Columbia. The American Bar Association's Standing Committee on the Federal Judiciary subsequently unanimously rated Petersen as "Qualified". On December 13, 2017, during his confirmation hearing before the Senate Judiciary Committee that subsequently went viral, Senator John Neely Kennedy questioned Petersen first about his relative inexperience in courtrooms and depositions and then about his knowledge of legal procedure, asking if Petersen knew what the Daubert standard was, and what a motion in limine was. He struggled to answer.

In response to the questions on his experience and knowledge, he said:

My background is not in litigation...And I understand, and I appreciate this line of questioning. I understand the challenge that would be ahead of me if I were fortunate enough to become a district court judge. I understand that the path that many successful district court judges have taken has been a different one than I have taken. But as I mentioned in my earlier answer, I believe that the path that I have taken to be one who’s been in a decision-making role in somewhere between 1,500 and 2,000 enforcement matters, overseen I don’t know how many cases in federal court the administration has been a party to during my time."

Petersen's answers received criticism in the press and from lawmakers. The New York Times described it as one of the "more painful Senate hearings in recent memory". Senator Sheldon Whitehouse (D-RI) complained that of the "basic questions of law" Senator Kennedy asked, Petersen could not "answer a single one". Legal scholar Alicia Bannon blamed Petersen's answers on "a lack of preparation and basic understanding of pretty basic legal concepts".

Carrie Campbell Severino, president of the Judicial Crisis Network, defended him in the National Review, saying that his time at the FEC gave him experience in trial-like procedures. Matthew Sanderson, a Republican attorney from the Washington, D.C., firm Caplin & Drysdale, argued in The Hill that Kennedy's concerns were largely irrelevant to the D.C. District, and criticized Kennedy as "bellitl[ing]" Petersen.

Petersen withdrew his nomination on December 16, 2017. On January 3, 2018, his nomination was returned to the President under Rule XXXI, Paragraph 6 of the Standing Rules of the United States Senate.

== See also ==
- Donald Trump judicial appointment controversies

Political offices
Preceded by Hans von Spakovsky	Member of the Federal Election Commission; 2008–present	Incumbent
Preceded by Steven T. Walther	Chairman of the Federal Election Commission; 2010	Succeeded by Cynthia L. Bauerly
Preceded by Ann M. Ravel	Chairman of the Federal Election Commission; 2016	Succeeded by Steven T. Walther
