= Dara Lindenbaum =

American lawyer

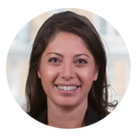

Chair of the Federal Election Commission
- In office January 1, 2023 – December 31, 2023
- President: Joe Biden
- Preceded by: Allen Dickerson
- Succeeded by: Sean J. Cooksey

Commissioner of the Federal Election Commission
- Incumbent
- Assumed office August 2, 2022
- President: Joe Biden
- Preceded by: Steven T. Walther

Personal details
- Party: Democratic
- Education: Northeastern University (BA); George Washington University (JD)

Dara Lindenbaum is an American election lawyer serving as a commissioner of the Federal Election Commission (FEC). She was nominated in January 2022 and confirmed by the Senate in May 2022.

== Education ==
Lindenbaum earned a Bachelor of Arts degree in art history from Northeastern University and a Juris Doctor from the George Washington University Law School in 2011.

== Career ==
During the Iraq War, Lindenbaum was an activist with Code Pink. After graduating from law school, she worked as associate counsel in the Voting Rights Project at the Lawyers' Committee for Civil Rights Under Law. She was also a development assistant at Americans United for Separation of Church and State. During the 2018 Georgia gubernatorial election, Lindenbaum worked as general counsel for Stacey Abrams's campaign. In 2020, Lindenbaum was legal counsel for Fair Fight Action. Prior to her governmental service Lindenbaum was a partner at Sandler Reiff Lamb Rosenstein & Birkenstock, P.C.

=== FEC Nomination ===
On January 21, 2022, President Joe Biden nominated Lindenbaum to be a commissioner of the Federal Election Commission. Hearings were held before the Senate Rules Committee on the nomination on April 6, 2022. The committee favorably reported the nomination on May 3, 2022. She was confirmed by the full Senate on May 24, 2022 by a vote of 54–38, with 6 Republicans supporting her confirmation. She was sworn in on August 2, 2022. She was elected as FEC Chair for 2023.
