= Institute for Free Speech =

American nonprofit organization

- Formation: 2005
- Founder: Bradley A. Smith
- Type: 501(c)(3) nonprofit organization
- Purpose: "To defend the First Amendment right to freedom of speech, press, assembly, and petition."
- Location: Washington, D.C.
- Region served: United States
- Revenue: $3.6 million (2023)
- Expenses: $3.1 million (2023)
- Website: www.ifs.org
- Formerly called: Center for Competitive Politics

The Institute for Free Speech (IFS), formerly called the Center for Competitive Politics, is a 501(c)(3) nonprofit organization headquartered in Washington, D.C.. IFS' stated mission is to "promote and defend the First Amendment rights to freely speak, assemble, publish, and petition the government through strategic litigation, communication, activism, training, research, and education." The organization has played a lead role in opposing campaign finance restrictions. It has worked to oppose limits on political donations and other campaign regulations.

== History ==
The Center for Competitive Politics was founded in 2005 by former Federal Election Commission Chairman Bradley A. Smith, a 2000 Clinton appointee who had been selected by congressional Republican leaders. Smith founded the organization with the goal of "challenging the current campaign finance system in both federal court and the court of public opinion."

In the wake of the Supreme Court decision in Citizens United v. FEC, the organization represented the plaintiffs in SpeechNow.org v. Federal Election Commission, the Court of Appeals decision that authorized the creation of Super PACs in 2010.

In 2014, the organization challenged California's requirement that nonprofit groups must turn over their donor lists to the state in order to receive a license to solicit contributions from residents of the state.

In 2014, the organization stated its opposition to a proposed constitutional amendment that would give Congress more power to regulate political spending. It has also opposed proposed Internal Revenue Service guidelines that would redefine tax rules for social welfare organizations that engage in political advocacy as a secondary activity.

In October 2017, the organization changed its name to the Institute for Free Speech, with an emphasis on "protecting First Amendment political speech rights".

Allen Dickerson, legal director of the institute, became a member of the Federal Election Commission in 2020, after being nominated by President Donald Trump and confirmed by a vote of 49 to 47 in the U.S. Senate.

== Activities ==
The Institute for Free Speech represents plaintiffs in free speech cases. It has been particularly active in criticizing campaign finance regulations, taxpayer-financed political campaigns, and restrictions on referendums and ballot initiatives. The organization publishes various studies and reports on campaign finance and political speech matters, and provides pro bono legal counsel to parties in suits challenging the constitutionality of campaign finance statutes. It has also defended the right of independent groups to participate freely in the electoral process.

The organization has a Free Speech Arguments Podcast that reviews oral arguments from First Amendment free political speech cases across the country.

In 2024, the organization released a study of state laws regarding free speech protection against frivolous lawsuits.

In 2024, the IFS sued the FEC over the discrepancy whereby small donors to federal election campaigns utilizing conduits ActBlue or WinRed are automatically made public but same-sized donations directly to the campaign are not. The suit seeks to afford the same level of anonymity to the small-donor conduit contributors.

== Board of directors ==
IFS's board of directors includes Ed Crane, Jenny Kim, Stephen Modzelewski, Eric O'Keefe, Daniel Shuchman, Bradley Smith, and John Snider.
