= Allen Dickerson =

Member of the United States Federal Election Commission

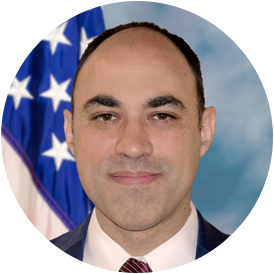

Chair of the Federal Election Commission
- In office January 1, 2022 – December 31, 2022
- President: Joe Biden
- Preceded by: Shana M. Broussard
- Succeeded by: Dara Lindenbaum

Commissioner of the Federal Election Commission
- In office December 17, 2020 – April 30, 2025
- President: Donald Trump; Joe Biden
- Preceded by: Caroline C. Hunter
- Succeeded by: Vacant

Personal details
- Party: Republican
- Education: Yale University (BA); New York University (JD)

Military service
- Allegiance: United States
- Branch/service: United States Army Reserve
- Rank: Major
- Unit: Judge Advocate General's Corps

Allen Joseph Dickerson is an American attorney who served as a Republican member of the Federal Election Commission from 2020 to 2025.

== Education ==
Dickerson received his undergraduate degree from Yale College and his Juris Doctor from New York University School of Law.

== Legal and military career ==
Dickerson was an Associate with Kirkland & Ellis. He was also the Legal Director at the Institute for Free Speech, where he led a nationwide First Amendment litigation practice. He is currently a Major in the Judge Advocate General's Corps in the United States Army Reserve. His writings have appeared in a range of publications, including the Harvard Business Law Review, Naval Law Review, Toledo Law Review, Campaigns & Elections, and USA Today.

== Federal Election Commission ==
On June 26, 2020, President Donald Trump announced his intent to nominate Dickerson to serve as a Commissioner of the Federal Election Commission. On September 16, 2020, his nomination was sent to the Senate. President Trump nominated Dickerson to the seat vacated by Caroline C. Hunter, who announced her resignation, effective on July 3, 2020. On December 9, 2020, he was confirmed by the Senate by a vote of 49–47. He was sworn in on December 17, 2020, with his term as Commissioner expiring on April 30, 2025. He served as Vice Chair in 2021 and Chairman in 2022. He resigned upon the expiration of his term.

Legal offices
Preceded by Caroline C. Hunter	Commissioner of the Federal Election Commission; 2020–2025	Vacant
Preceded by Shana M. Broussard	Chair of the Federal Election Commission; 2022	Succeeded by Dara Lindenbaum
