= Lee E. Goodman =

American government official (born 1964)

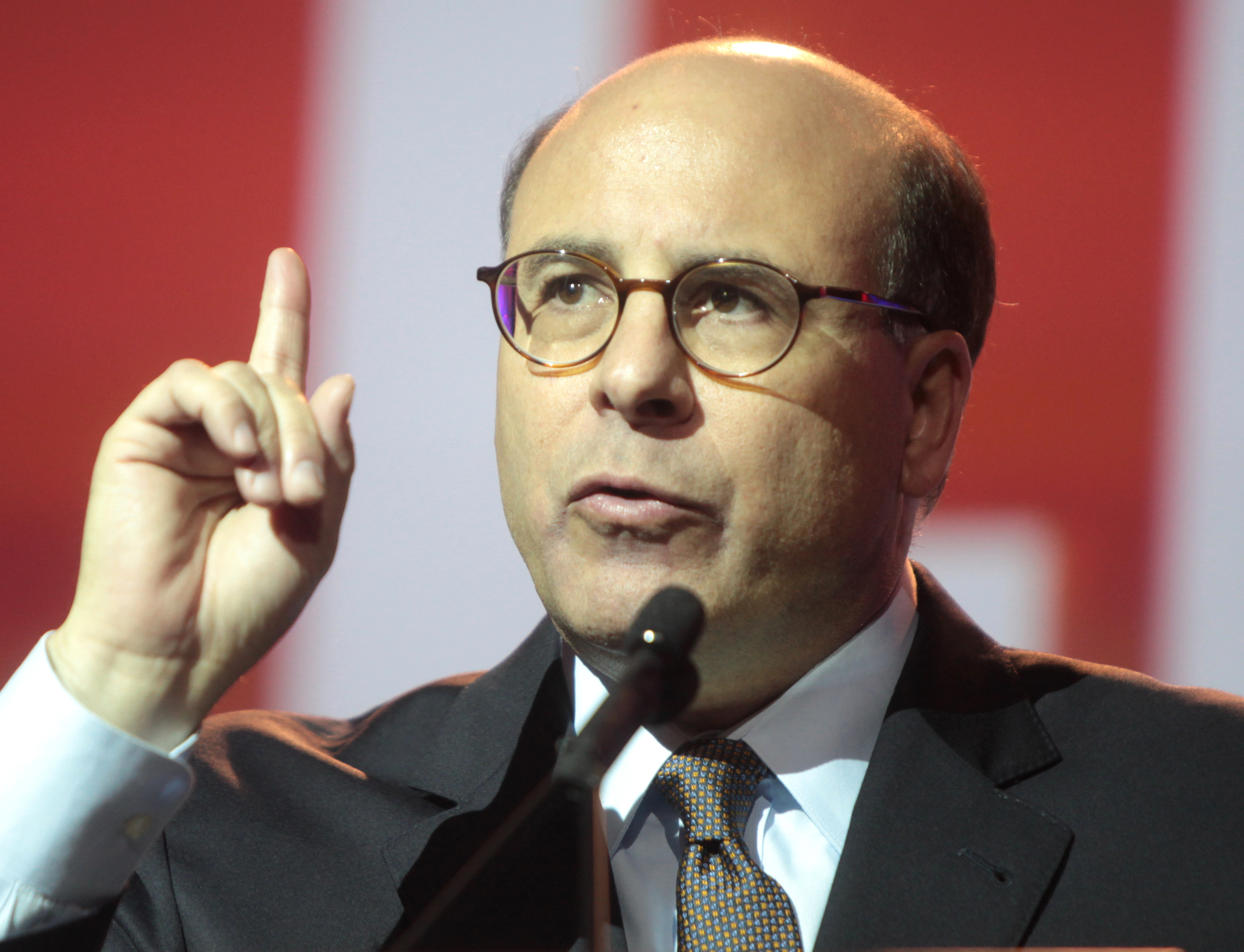

Chair of the Federal Election Commission
- In office January 1, 2014 – December 31, 2014
- Preceded by: Ellen L. Weintraub
- Succeeded by: Ann M. Ravel

Member of the Federal Election Commission
- In office October 22, 2013 – February 16, 2018
- Nominated by: Barack Obama
- Preceded by: Don McGahn
- Succeeded by: Sean J. Cooksey

Personal details
- Born: March 29, 1964 (age 62) Danville, Virginia
- Party: Republican
- Education: University of Virginia (BA, JD)
- Profession: Attorney

Lee E. Goodman (born March 29, 1964) was a member and former chair of the Federal Election Commission (FEC), an independent regulatory agency created by Congress to administer and enforce campaign finance law.

== Biography ==
Goodman was born on March 29, 1964, in Danville, Virginia. His father was a lawyer and his mother was a teacher. He received his B.A. degree with highest distinction in 1986 from the University of Virginia, where he double majored in American Government and Rhetoric & Communication Studies. He received his J.D. degree in 1990 from the University of Virginia School of Law, where he served as Articles Editor for the U.Va. Journal of Law & Politics.

Goodman practiced election law in private practice for the better part of two decades and served in a number of governmental and political posts. In private practice, he represented candidates, public officials, political parties, political action committees, non-profit organizations, and media companies in addressing a wide range of laws regulating their political activities and speech. He advised four presidential campaigns from 2007 to 2012. He served as general counsel of the Republican Party of Virginia (2009–2013). He also represented non-political clients in addressing other regulatory and public policy issues. Goodman has authored several articles on election law, including a chapter on regulation of political speech on the Internet in the book Law and Election Politics - The Rules of the Game (Routledge 2013), and he has lectured frequently on election law topics. He has served on the boards of several political, educational and cultural non-profit organizations. He is recognized as a national expert in close elections, recounts and election administration. Goodman was the 2014 Lefever Fellow at Elizabethtown College.

His prior government service includes four years as legal counsel and policy advisor to the Governor of Virginia (1998–2002) and three years as counsel and special assistant to the Attorney General of Virginia (1995–1997). He served as chief adviser to the Chairman of the Congressional Advisory Commission on Electronic Commerce (1999–2000).

On February 7, 2018, Goodman announced his retirement from the FEC effective February 16, 2018.
