= Wiley Rein =

American law firm

Wiley
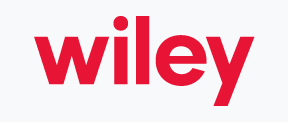
- Headquarters: 2050 M Street NW; Washington, D.C.
- No. of offices: 1
- No. of attorneys: 240
- No. of employees: 450
- Major practice areas: General practice
- Revenue: $227,482,000
- Date founded: 1983; 43 years ago (Washington, D.C.)
- Company type: Limited liability partnership
- Website: www.wiley.law

Wiley Rein LLP, sometimes shortened to Wiley, is an American law firm based in Washington, D.C. With 260 lawyers, the firm represents clients in complex regulatory, litigation, and transactional matters. Many of the firm's lawyers and public policy advisors have held senior positions in the White House, on Capitol Hill, and in federal agencies, including the U.S. Department of Defense, the U.S. Patent and Trademark Office, and the U.S. Department of Justice. The firm operates in industries including energy, manufacturing, defense, aerospace, intelligence, information technology, professional services, telecommunications, health care, architectural and engineering (A&E), and construction.

== History ==
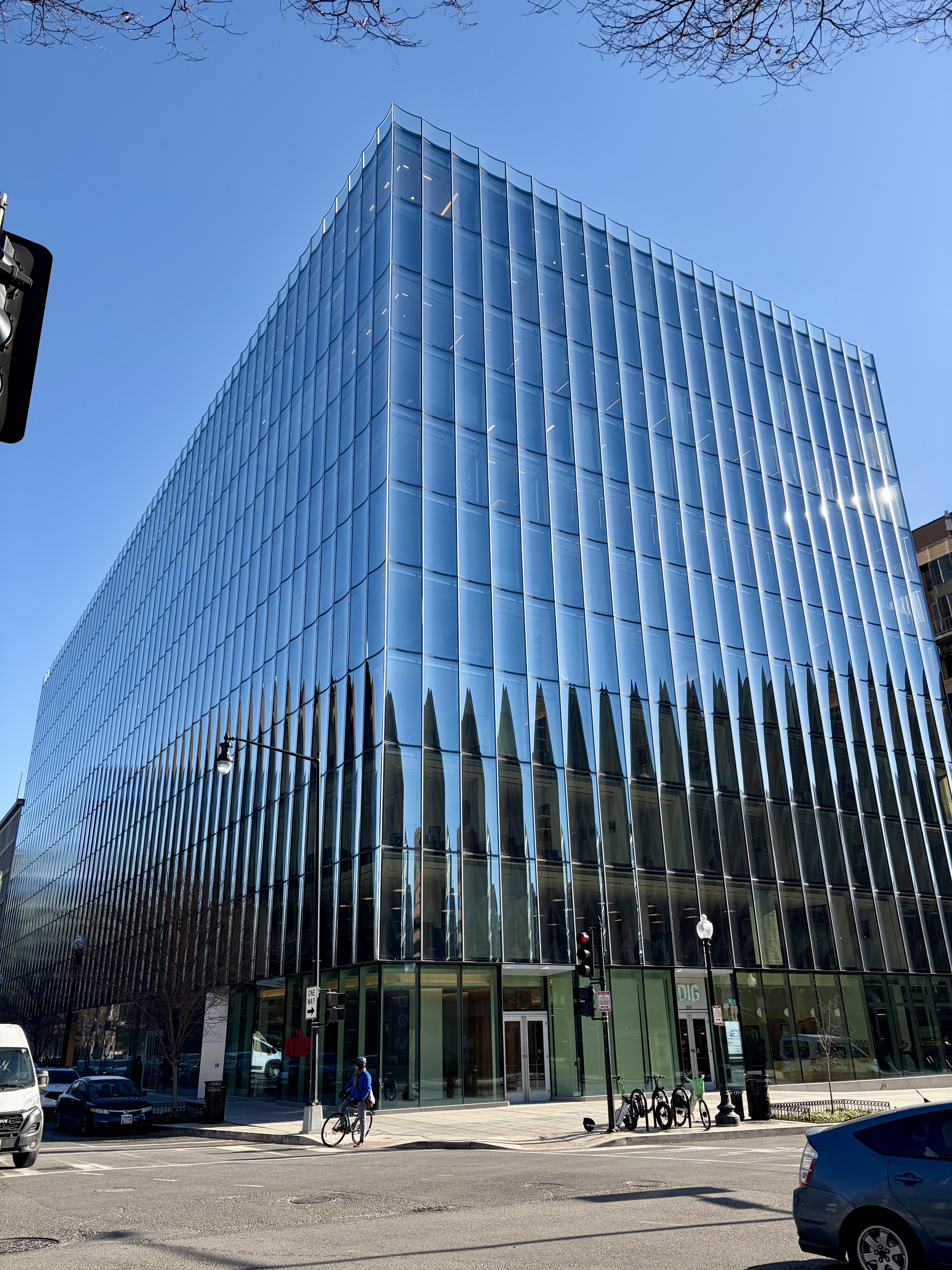
Wiley Rein's headquarters in Washington, D.C.

Wiley opened its doors with 39 attorneys in 1983 as Wiley, Johnson & Rein. In 1986, the firm, then known as Wiley & Rein, became Wiley Rein & Fielding as Richard E. Wiley, former Chairman of the Federal Communications Commission, and Bert W. Rein, former Deputy Assistant Secretary of State for Economic and Business Affairs, were joined on the masthead by Fred F. Fielding, former Counsel to President Ronald Reagan. With Fielding's return to the White House as Counsel to President George W. Bush on February 1, 2007, the firm reverted to the name Wiley Rein LLP. In 2020, Wiley Rein announced a new brand identity, and is now known as Wiley. The firm's legal name remains Wiley Rein LLP.

In December 2014, Wiley acquired McBee Strategic Consulting, subsequently known as SIGNAL Group, as a wholly owned subsidiary. The firms previously operated separately, but in 2024, SIGNAL group bought out Wiley's ownership stake to regain independent management.

During the 2020 COVID-19 pandemic, the company received between $5 million and $10 million in federally backed small business loans from City National Bank as part of the Paycheck Protection Program. The group stated it would allow them to retain 493 jobs. Peter Zeughauser stated in The Wall Street Journal that "it's troubling, and it's inappropriate" that large law firms took the loans, comparing it to other firms where partners reduced their pay; WSJ noted Rein and others have average partner profits above $1.2 million per year and make over $100 million per year.

In 2020, Wiley Rein changed its company branding to "Wiley", while retaining "Wiley Rein LLP" as its legal name. In June 2020, the firm indicated it was moving into a new "trophy office building" built for Tishman Speyer and designed by REX, and completed the move in 2021.

In 2025, Wiley's email accounts were reported to have been accessed by hackers in China.

== Notable alumni ==
- Brendan Carr — Current Federal Communications Commission Commissioner appointed by Donald Trump
- Fred F. Fielding — former White House Counsel; former named-partner of the firm; formerly served as Counsel to the President and as a commissioner on the 9/11 Commission
- Thomas B. Griffith — Circuit Judge on the U.S. Court of Appeals for the District of Columbia Circuit
- Scott S. Harris — Chief legal counsel of the Supreme Court of the United States; 20th clerk of the court
- Sarah Isgur — former spokesperson at the US Department of Justice
- Kevin J. Martin — former chairman of the Federal Communications Commission
- Julie Menin — member of the New York City Council
- Matthew S. Petersen— Member of the Federal Election Commission appointed by George W. Bush
- Margaret A. Ryan — Judge on the Court of Appeals for the Armed Forces

== Practices ==
Major practice groups include Telecom, Media & Technology; Election Law & Government Ethics; Government Contracts; Insurance; Intellectual Property; International Trade; Environment & Product Regulation; Litigation; FTC Regulation; National Security; Privacy, Cyber & Data Governance; and White Collar Defense & Government Investigations.

== Pro bono and community service ==
Wiley is recognized for its service to the local community and pro bono efforts, including negotiating a landmark health-care-related settlement on behalf of inmates at a Virginia women's prison, a settlement with the Baltimore Police Department in a civil rights case, and teaching high school students at the Academies at Anacostia. The law firm's charitable initiatives have included participation in the Lawyers Have Heart 10K Race, 5K Run & Walk for the American Heart Association, guest bartending to raise money for D.C.'s Legal Aid Society, and a Thanksgiving basket drive to benefit Bread for the city. In 2013, the firm initiated a pro bono awards program, and in 2014, Theodore A. Howard was named a full-time pro bono partner. Wiley is regularly ranked among the top ten in Washington Business Journal's Corporate Philanthropy List (Midsize Companies by Giving in Greater D.C.).

== Awards and rankings ==
- Chambers Global (2019)
- Chambers USA (2019)
- Legal 500 US (2019)
- National Law Journal's D.C. Litigation Department of the Year for Insurance (2014)
- Law360's "Practice Groups of the Year" (2018): Telecommunications, Government Contracts, and International Trade
- Washingtonian Best Lawyers (2018)
- U.S. News Best Lawyers (2019)

In the 2020 Vault Rankings, Wiley was ranked as the 31st best law firm to work for in Washington, D.C. Chambers USA ranks Wiley's media, telecom, insurance, and white collar defense groups as leading practices in Washington, D.C., and its government contracts, election law, trade, and privacy practices among the best nationwide.
