= Don McGahn =

American government official (born 1968)

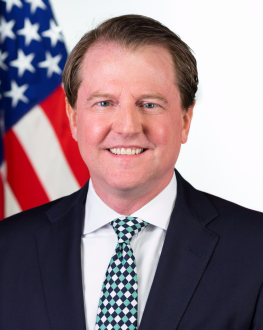

White House Counsel
- In office January 20, 2017 – October 17, 2018
- President: Donald Trump
- Preceded by: Neil Eggleston
- Succeeded by: Emmet Flood (Acting)

Chair of the Federal Election Commission
- In office July 10, 2008 – December 31, 2008
- President: George W. Bush
- Preceded by: David Mason
- Succeeded by: Steven T. Walther

Member of the Federal Election Commission
- In office July 9, 2008 – September 12, 2013
- President: George W. Bush; Barack Obama
- Preceded by: David Mason
- Succeeded by: Lee E. Goodman

Personal details
- Born: Donald Francis McGahn II; June 16, 1968 (age 58) Atlantic City, New Jersey, U.S.
- Party: Republican
- Spouse: Shannon McGahn
- Children: 2
- Education: University of Notre Dame (BA); Widener University (JD); Georgetown University (LLM)

Donald Francis McGahn II (/məˈɡæn/ mə-GAN; born June 16, 1968) is an American lawyer who served as White House counsel for U.S. president Donald Trump, from the day of Trump's inauguration through October 17, 2018, when McGahn resigned. Previously, McGahn served on the Federal Election Commission for over five years. In November 2019, McGahn received a court order to testify before the U.S. House of Representatives. In August 2020, the United States Court of Appeals for the District of Columbia Circuit ruled 7–2 that the House can sue him to comply.

== Early life and education ==
Don McGahn was born on June 16, 1968, and grew up in Atlantic City, New Jersey, the son of Noreen (née Rogan) and Donald F. McGahn. He is a nephew of Joseph McGahn, former Democratic New Jersey State Senator and medical director at Donald Trump's Resorts International, and Atlantic City attorney Patrick McGahn, who had represented Trump's casino interests from 1982 until Trump sued him for alleged overbilling in 1995.

Don McGahn attended Our Lady Star of the Sea School in Atlantic City and Holy Spirit High School in nearby Absecon. He briefly attended the United States Naval Academy before transferring to the University of Notre Dame. At the University of Notre Dame he received a B.A. degree in history and computer applications. He obtained his J.D. degree from Widener University Commonwealth Law School in 1994. In 2002, later in his career, he earned an LL.M. degree from the Georgetown University Law Center.

== Career ==
After graduation from law school, McGahn worked in campaign finance law at the Washington, D.C., office of law firm Patton Boggs. From 1999 to 2008, McGahn was chief counsel for the National Republican Congressional Committee (NRCC).

George W. Bush nominated McGahn as a Republican-selected member of the Federal Election Commission (FEC) in 2008. He was confirmed on June 24, 2008, by the United States Senate and was sworn in shortly thereafter. He is credited as having played a crucial role in loosening regulations on campaign spending. According to documentary footage in the 2018 film Dark Money, McGahn's brief period as incoming chair of the Commission ushered in a newly partisan rigor to the FEC whereby he and his two fellow Republican members, also new, formed an unprecedented lockstep voting bloc preventing any and all enforcement of FEC regulations. McGahn resigned from the FEC in September 2013.

After leaving the FEC, McGahn returned to the law firm Patton Boggs. In 2014 he moved to the law firm of Jones Day in Washington, D.C. He also worked for the Koch affiliated Freedom Partners. McGahn brought five Jones Day lawyers with him to the White House, and six more were appointed to senior posts in the Trump Administration.

=== Donald Trump 2016 Presidential campaign ===
McGahn served as Donald Trump's campaign counsel during his 2016 campaign for president. McGahn managed all litigation involving Donald Trump's 2016 Presidential campaign. Early in 2016, he stopped efforts to keep Trump off of the Republican primary ballot in New Hampshire by going to court and winning to ensure ballot access in a key primary state. Several weeks before the election, lawsuits were filed in four battleground states alleging voter intimidation and seeking to enjoin the Trump campaign from having observers at polling locations. McGahn successfully managed and won these litigations.

=== Trump presidency ===
Shortly after Trump was elected, he named McGahn General Counsel of the Presidential Transition Team. On November 25, 2016, McGahn was named White House Counsel for the President-elect's new administration.

Since Jones Day has also represented the Trump campaign in its dealings with Robert Mueller, McGahn secured an ethics waiver that allows him to talk to his old firm when its clients have business before the U.S. government.

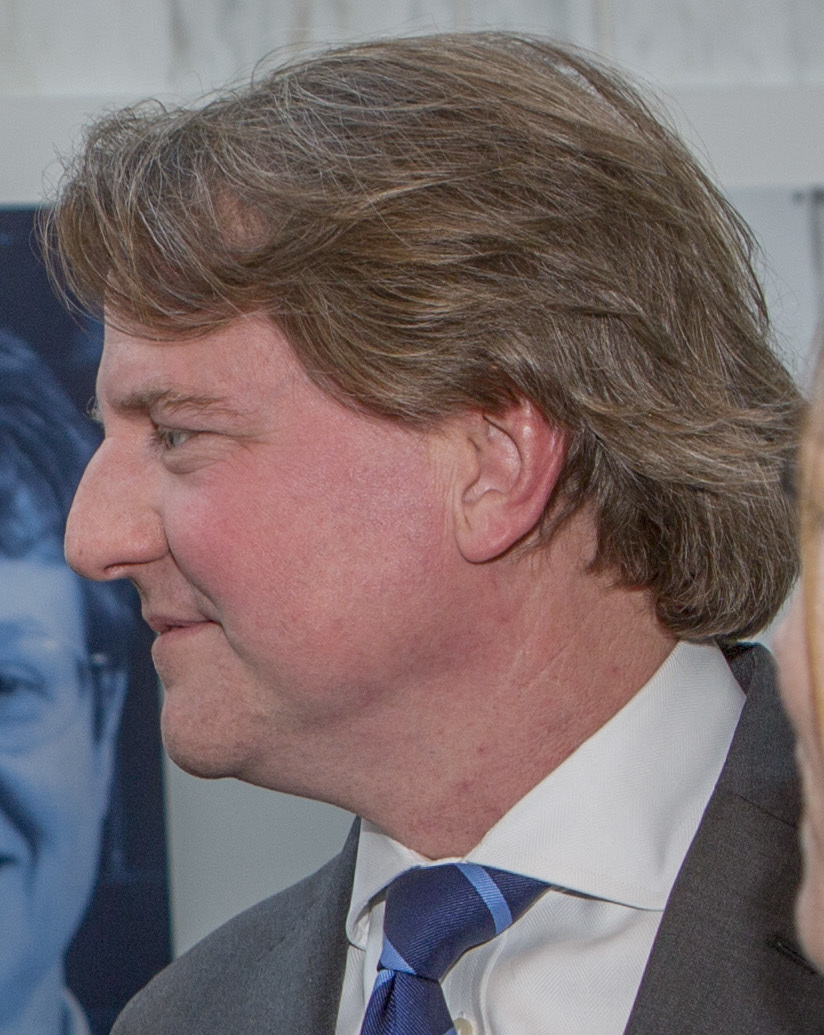
Don McGahn at the Marine Barracks Washington Sunset Parade on June 6, 2017

McGahn personally recommended Trump nominate Neil Gorsuch to replace Antonin Scalia and Brett Kavanaugh to replace Anthony Kennedy on the Supreme Court. Gorsuch's first official interview with Trump staff was on January 5, 2017, when McGahn met with him in Trump Tower. Trump and McGahn met with him on January 14, 2017. McGahn called Gorsuch on January 27, 2017, to tell him that he had been selected as the nominee. Gorsuch was sworn in on Monday April 10, 2017. McGahn also recommended the nomination of Labor Secretary Alexander Acosta. Acosta was sworn in on April 28, 2017.

McGahn assembled a team of lawyers to oversee filling all judicial vacancies. Guided by McGahn's team, President Trump had already appointed ten appellate judges by November 11, 2017, the most that early in a presidency since Richard Nixon.

According to The New York Times, McGahn conveyed instructions from President Trump to Attorney General Jeff Sessions, requesting Sessions not to recuse himself from overseeing investigations into Russian interference in the 2016 Presidential election. McGahn was unaware that Sessions had already consulted with career attorneys at the Department of Justice. When Sessions informed him he had already decided to recuse himself, McGahn ceased further discussion of the topic. In response to this, Walter Shaub, former director of the United States Office of Government Ethics, said McGahn had "done much to undermine anticorruption mechanisms in this country." Shaub said, "It is a crime for a federal employee to participate in a particular matter in which he has a financial interest."

In January 2018, The New York Times reported that in June 2017, the president asked McGahn to instruct top Justice Department officials to dismiss special counsel Robert Mueller, and that McGahn refused, instead threatening to resign.

The Times reported on August 18, 2018, that McGahn had been cooperating extensively with the Special Counsel investigation for several months and that he and his lawyer had become concerned that Trump "had decided to let Mr. McGahn take the fall for decisions that could be construed as obstruction of justice, like the Comey firing, by telling the special counsel that he was only following shoddy legal advice from Mr. McGahn."

On August 29, 2018, President Trump announced "McGahn will be leaving his position in the fall, shortly after the confirmation (hopefully) of Judge Brett Kavanaugh to the United States Supreme Court. I have worked with Don for a long time and truly appreciate his service!" McGahn formally departed the Trump administration on October 17, 2018.

In November 2018 it was reported that in spring 2018, Trump told McGahn that he wanted the Justice Department to prosecute Hillary Clinton and James Comey. McGahn told Trump that he had no authority to order a prosecution and that while he could request an investigation, that too could prompt accusations of abuse of power. McGahn had White House lawyers write a memo to Trump warning that if he asked law enforcement to investigate his rivals, he could face possible impeachment.

McGahn returned to Jones Day in March 2019 as the head of the firm's Government Regulation Practice.

According to Mueller's final report, McGahn complained to White House chief of staff Reince Priebus that Trump was trying to get him to "do crazy shit." The president responded that McGahn was a "lying bastard."

On May 7, 2019, the White House instructed McGahn not to comply with a subpoena issued by the House Judiciary Committee, instructing the committee to redirect its records requests related to Mueller's investigation to the White House; McGahn is the most cited witness in the Mueller Report. House Speaker Nancy Pelosi referenced the action as an obstruction of justice, stating during an event at Cornell University, "Trump is goading us to impeach him[.]" A week later, it was reported that Trump's lawyers believed that McGahn told Mueller he did not believe Trump obstructed the investigation and ordered him not to provide any documents he had to the Judiciary Committee. On May 21, 2019, McGahn defied a subpoena to testify before the House Judiciary Committee, at the direction of his former client. On August 7, the House filed a lawsuit with the United States District Court for the District of Columbia in an effort to challenge this precedent-setting move.

== Congressional subpoena ==
On November 25, 2019, U.S. District Judge Ketanji Brown Jackson ruled that McGahn, who the Trump administration ordered not to cooperate with the investigation, must cooperate with the investigation and comply with a House of Representatives subpoena to testify. The Justice Department requested a stay pending an appeal of the ruling, but on December 2, Jackson rejected the request, calling the DOJ's assertion that the House Judiciary Committee would not be harmed by a stay "disingenuous." Jackson wrote, "DOJ's argument here that any further delay will not be harmful to the Judiciary Committee because, in essence, DOJ has already harmed the Committee's interests by successfully delaying its access to other materials strikes this Court as an unacceptable mischaracterization of the injury at issue."

On February 28, 2020, a divided panel of the United States Court of Appeals for the District of Columbia Circuit reversed that judgment and ordered the House's lawsuit dismissed. Circuit Judge Thomas B. Griffith, joined by Circuit Judge Karen LeCraft Henderson, determined that the separation of powers under the United States Constitution does not allow Congress to use the Courts to force Executive officials to testify. Judge Henderson wrote a concurrence in which she argued the House simply did not have standing to sue in this instance. Judge Judith W. Rogers wrote a dissent.

On appeal from the House, on March 13, 2020, the full Court agreed to reconsider the case. On August 7, the full Court ruled that the House of Representatives could sue to enforce the subpoena, but then, on August 31, the court ruled that the House had never been legally empowered by Congress to sue to enforce subpoenas.

== Personal life ==
McGahn is married to Shannon McGahn, a lobbyist with the National Association of Realtors. Shannon was a former Counselor to Secretary of the Treasury Steven Mnuchin and staff director of the House Financial Services Committee. They have two sons. He is a Roman Catholic. McGahn has played guitar for more than 20 years and studied at Berklee College of Music. He plays lead guitar for an act called Scott's New Band.

== See also ==
- Russian interference in the 2016 United States elections

Political offices
Preceded by David Mason	Member of the Federal Election Commission; 2008–2013	Succeeded by Lee E. Goodman
Preceded by David Mason	Chair of the Federal Election Commission; 2008	Succeeded by Steven T. Walther
Legal offices
Preceded by Neil Eggleston	White House Counsel; 2017–2018	Succeeded by Emmet Flood; Acting
