= Cynthia L. Bauerly =

American civil servant

Cynthia Bauerly
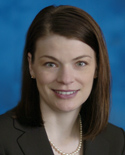

Minnesota Commissioner of Revenue
- In office January 5, 2015 – October 2, 2020
- Governor: Mark Dayton; Tim Walz
- Preceded by: Myron Frans
- Succeeded by: Robert Doty

Chair of the Federal Election Commission
- In office January 1, 2011 – December 31, 2011
- Preceded by: Matthew S. Petersen
- Succeeded by: Caroline C. Hunter

Member of the Federal Election Commission
- In office June 24, 2008 – February 1, 2013
- President: George W. Bush; Barack Obama
- Preceded by: Robert D. Lenhard
- Succeeded by: Ann Ravel

Personal details
- Born: c. 1970 (age 55–56)
- Party: Democratic
- Education: Concordia College; Indiana University, Bloomington

Cynthia L. Bauerly (born 1970) is an American civil servant who previously served as the Commissioner of the Minnesota Department of Revenue from 2015 until 2020.

== Career ==
Prior to joining Revenue, she served as Deputy Commissioner of Workforce Development at the Minnesota Department of Employment and Economic Development (DEED).

Prior to her state government service, she served in various federal roles, including being a member of the United States Federal Election Commission. She was nominated by President George W. Bush on May 6, 2008. Her appointment received the unanimous consent of the United States Senate on June 24, 2008.

Prior to her appointment, Bauerly served as Legislative Director for Senator Chuck Schumer of New York.

In 2004 and 2005, Bauerly specialized in intellectual property and business litigation with Fredrikson & Byron in Minneapolis, Minnesota. From February until November 2005, she was the policy director for Amy Klobuchar's successful United States Senate campaign in Minnesota.

From 2002 until 2004, Bauerly served as Senator Schumer's counsel on the Senate Judiciary Committee and Senate Rules Committee.

Prior to her work for Senator Schumer, she specialized in complex litigation and appellate law at Jones Day in Washington, D.C. She previously served as a judicial clerk for Florence-Marie Cooper of the United States District Court for the Central District of California and Theodore R. Boehm of the Indiana Supreme Court.

In 2015, Minnesota governor Mark Dayton appointed Baurely to Commissioner of Revenue. Governor Tim Walz reappointed her in 2019. She resigned in 2020 as the longest-serving Revenue Commissioner in Minnesota.

== Education ==
Bauerly graduated cum laude from Indiana University School of Law – Bloomington and received a Master of Public Affairs from Indiana University's School of Environmental and Public Affairs. Bauerly is a summa cum laude graduate of Concordia College in Moorhead, Minnesota.

Political offices
Preceded by Matthew S. Petersen	Chairperson of the Federal Election Commission; 2011	Succeeded by Caroline C. Hunter
