= David M. Mason =

American politician

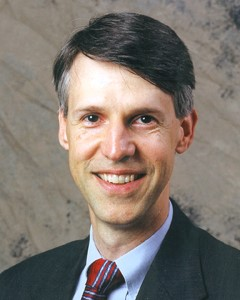
- Official portrait, c. 2001

Member of the Federal Election Commission
- In office August 6, 1998 – July 2008
- President: Bill Clinton; George W Bush
- Preceded by: Trevor Potter
- Succeeded by: Don McGahn

Personal details
- Born: 1957 (age 68–69)
- Party: Republican
- Education: Lynchburg College; Claremont McKenna College

David M. Mason (born 1957) was nominated to the Federal Election Commission by President Bill Clinton on March 4, 1998 and confirmed by the U.S. Senate on July 30, 1998. He was nominated for a second term by President George W. Bush on December 19, 2005. Mason served as a member of the Commission’s Finance Committee. In 2008, President Bush removed Mason from the FEC and replaced him with Don McGahn.

Prior to his appointment, Mason was Senior Fellow in Congressional Studies at the Heritage Foundation. He joined Heritage in 1990 and served at various times as Director of Executive Branch Liaison, Director of the Foundation’s U.S. Congress Assessment Project, and Vice President, Government Relations.

Mason served as Deputy Assistant Secretary of Defense, where he managed the Pentagon’s relations with the U.S. House of Representatives. One of his major accomplishments there was guiding base closing legislation to a successful conclusion.

He has served on Capitol Hill, as a Legislative Assistant to Senator John Warner, Legislative Director to Representative Tom Bliley, and Staff Director to then-House Republican Whip Trent Lott. He was active as a staffer and volunteer in numerous Congressional, Senate, Gubernatorial and Presidential campaigns, and was himself the Republican nominee for the Virginia House of Delegates in the 48th District in 1982, who ended up losing in the general election to his opponent Mary Marshall.

Mason attended Lynchburg College in Virginia and graduated cum laude from Claremont McKenna College in California. He was active in political and community affairs in northern Virginia and in the home education movement nationally.

== 1982 General Election Virginia House of Delegates 48th district ==
General Election 1982
Party	Candidate	Votes	%	±%
Democrat	Mary A. Marshall	10,365	60.3%	
Republican	David M. Mason	6,830	39.7%	
