= Robert D. Lenhard =

American lawyer

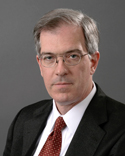
Robert D. Lenhard, former chairman of the Federal Election Commission.

Robert D. Lenhard is a senior attorney in the Election and Political Law Practice Group of Covington & Burling. He formerly served as Chairman of the Federal Election Commission, the United States government agency that administers and enforces the Federal Election Campaign Act (FECA), the statute that governs the financing of federal elections. Lenhard was appointed to his FEC position via a recess appointment by George W. Bush on January 4, 2006.

== History ==
Lenhard is a 1981 graduate of the Johns Hopkins University where he earned a B.A. with Honors, and a 1984 graduate of the University of California, Los Angeles School of Law.

Lenhard was an associate general counsel with the American Federation of State, County and Municipal Employees (AFSCME) from 1991 until he became a member of the Federal Election Commission. At AFSCME, he was responsible for legal issues related to federal and state election laws. His work included counseling the union on federal and state campaign finance issues, litigating enforcement actions before the FEC and state agencies, and providing training to field staff on federal and state election law issues. Prior to becoming an Associate General Counsel at AFSCME, Lenhard was an associate at the law firm of Kirschner, Weinberg & Dempsey, where he represented AFSCME and other labor unions. Prior to that, Mr. Lenhard worked for the United Mine Workers of America (UMWA) and the Amalgamated Clothing and Textile Workers Union (ACTWU). After graduating from law school, Lenhard worked as an associate at the Los Angeles law firm of Grace, Neumeyer & Otto.

=== 2024 presidential election ===
Lenhard is co-leading legal offensives on behalf of the Democratic Party against third-party candidates in the 2024 United States presidential election, alongside former White House Counsel Dana Remus.
