= Small-dollar donation =

Political donations in the United States

Small dollar donations are defined according to United States campaign finance law as contributions to a candidate's political campaign or a political action committee which are between $1 and $200.

In US primary elections, the quantity of small dollar donations made to a candidate's political campaign has been used as a metric to measure popular support. (Higher individual donations (up to $3,300 for the 2023-2024 cycle) or corporate contributions were more common in past decades.) Small dollar donations are also used by the dominant US parties—the Republican Party and the Democratic Party—as a benchmark (along with an overall polling support minimum) to qualify primary candidates for televised debate events.

== See also ==
- Citizens United v. FEC
- Political action committee
