= Institute for Law and Politics =

The Institute for Law and Politics is an interdisciplinary research institute based at the University of Minnesota Law School. The Institute for Law and Politics brings together faculty from the Law School and the University of Minnesota Political Science department to study national and international issues at the intersection of law and politics.

The institute's work includes conferences, research and public policy advocacy around issues of election law, campaign finance reform, voting rights, judicial politics, separation of powers and international elections and rule of law.

== Mission and Focus Areas ==
The ILP conducts research, hosts conferences, and engages in public policy advocacy on key topics, including:

- Election Law & Voting Rights – Analyzing voter access, redistricting, and electoral integrity.
- Campaign Finance Reform – Studying the impact of money in politics and regulatory frameworks.
- Judicial Politics – Examining judicial appointments, decision-making, and the politicization of courts.
- Separation of Powers – Researching executive-legislative-judicial conflicts in the U.S. and abroad.
- International Rule of Law – Assessing democratic backsliding and election security in comparative contexts.
