= Ann Ravel =

American attorney (born 1949)

Ann M. Ravel
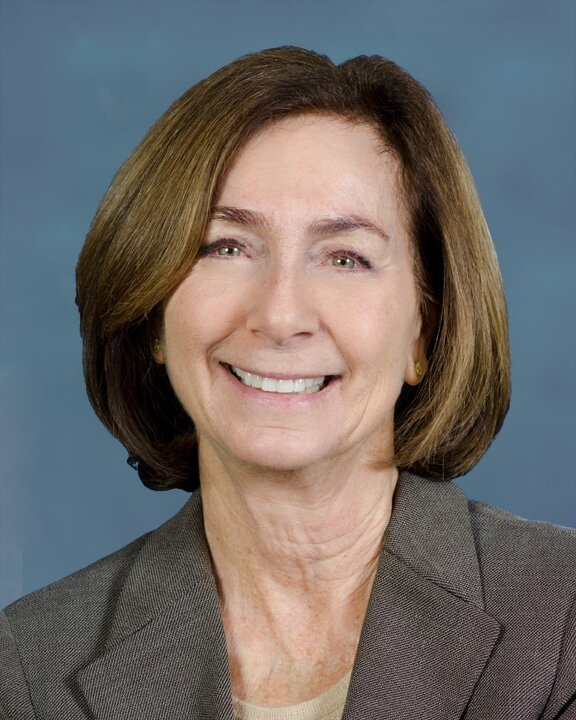

Chair of the Federal Election Commission
- In office January 1, 2015 – December 31, 2015
- Preceded by: Lee E. Goodman
- Succeeded by: Matthew S. Petersen

Member of the Federal Election Commission
- In office October 25, 2013 – March 1, 2017
- Nominated by: Barack Obama
- Preceded by: Cynthia L. Bauerly
- Succeeded by: Shana M. Broussard

Personal details
- Born: Ann Miller; April 6, 1949 (age 77) United States
- Party: Democratic
- Spouse: Stephen Ravel
- Children: Three
- Education: Hastings Law School, UC Berkeley
- Profession: Attorney

Ann Miller Ravel (born April 6, 1949) is an American attorney who was a Democratic Commissioner on the Federal Election Commission (FEC), an independent regulatory agency created by Congress to administer and enforce campaign finance law.

Ravel was appointed by President Obama on June 21, 2013, and, after unanimous confirmation by the United States Senate, took office on October 25, 2013. She was Chair of the commission for 2015, and Vice Chair in 2014. Ravel resigned from the commission on February 19, 2017, effective March 1, 2017. Ravel is currently a professor at the University of California, Berkeley School of Law.

Ann Ravel was a candidate in the 2020 election for California State Senate in District 15, but lost to Dave Cortese.

== Biography ==
Ravel was born in the U.S. to an American father and Brazilian mother. At age five, Ravel moved from the U.S. to Chile where her father had a job with the U.S. government before moving back to San Jose, California, when her father took a teaching position at San Jose State College.

After graduating from Willow Glen High School in San Jose, Ravel received a B.A. from the University of California, Berkeley, in 1970 and her J.D. from the University of California, Hastings College of the Law, in 1974. She lives in Los Gatos, California with her husband, Stephen, an independent adoption attorney. She has three children, two granddaughters and one grandson.

== Political career ==
Ravel has served as Chair of the Federal Election Commission (FEC) and led the California Fair Political Practices Commission (FPPC).

Prior to joining the FEC, Ravel was appointed by California governor Jerry Brown in February 2011 to serve as the Chair of the California Fair Political Practices Commission (FPPC). At the FPPC, Ravel oversaw the regulation of campaign finance, lobbyist registration and reporting, and ethics and conflicts of interest related to officeholders and public employees. In Ravel's most significant case as chair, the FPPC pursued a year-long investigation into the methods used by donors who seek to influence political campaigns by anonymous methods. In October 2013, the FPPC fined the center to Protect Patient Rights and Americans for Responsible Leadership $1 million for forwarding $15 million in "dark money" contributions to a California committee without disclosing the source of those contributions. Ravel testified about the case before the Senate Rules and Administration Committee considering the issue of nondisclosure by political groups on April 30, 2014. While at the FPPC, Ravel sought to leverage technology to "enhance efficiency, improve governance and repair the relationship between the public and their government." To that end, the FPPC adopted regulations to allow political contributions to be made by text message and created an online, searchable database of California public officials' Statements of Economic Interests. During Ravel's tenure, the FPPC also released a mobile phone application to track gifts received by public officials and held a hackathon to explore creative options to better disclose the Agency's public data. As Chair of the FPPC, Ravel created the Regulation Clarification Project, an effort to clarify and streamline California regulations. This project was designed to make the law more understandable to the public, promote easier and less onerous compliance for state and local officials, and ensure that the regulations complied with the governing statutes and courts decisions. Among other changes, the FPPC created guides to analyze gift laws and reorganized the regulations by topic. During her tenure at the FPPC, she established the States Unified Network (SUN) Center, a nonpartisan group of state and local jurisdictions promoting transparency in campaign finance. The group shares enforcement, litigation, and campaign finance data through a public website, which provides nationwide disclosure and aids in enforcement.

Before joining the FPPC, Ravel was Deputy Assistant Attorney General for Torts and Consumer Litigation in the Civil Division of the United States Department of Justice. She also worked as an attorney in the Santa Clara County Counsel's Office, ultimately serving as the appointed County Counsel from 1998 until 2009. Ravel represented the county and its elected officials, provided advice on the state Political Reform Act, initiated programs in elder abuse litigation, educational rights, and consumer litigation on behalf of the Santa Clara County government and the community, and joined a group of California municipal attorneys suing to overturn the state's ban on same-sex marriage.

Ravel has served as an elected Governor on the Board of Governors of the State Bar of California, a member of the Judicial Council of California, and Chair of the Commission on Judicial Nominees Evaluation. Ravel received the Professional Woman of Achievement Award from the San Jose Mercury News and the Commission on the Status of Women in 1980, the Elizabeth Ent Award for her contributions to law and justice in 1995, and the Circle of Service Achievement Award from the California State Association of Counties in 2004. In 2007, the State Bar of California recognized Ravel's contributions to public service, naming her Public Attorney of the Year. In 2014, she was named as a California Attorney of the Year by California Lawyer magazine for her contributions to Government law.

Ravel was appointed member of the Federal Election Commission (FEC) by President Obama on June 21, 2013, and took office on October 25, 2013, after being confirmation by the Senate. On October 24, 2014, Ravel called for "a reexamination of the commission's approach to the internet and other emerging technologies..." "The suggestion on its face should have been non-controversial: 'As a Commission, we need to consider the changing role of technology in our elections and recognize how technology is changing our politics. For that reason, next year, I will bring together technologists, social entrepreneurs, policy wonks, politicos, and activists—from across the spectrum—to discuss new and emerging technologies and how the Commission's current approach may or may not fit with future innovations.'" Then-FEC chairman Lee Goodman "characterized the suggestion as an attempt to regulate speech."

In May 2015, Ravel told the New York Times that it is unlikely that the FEC will be able to regulate the coming 2016 presidential election. "The likelihood of the laws being enforced is slim," she told The New York Times. "I never want to give up, but I'm not under any illusions. People think the FEC is dysfunctional. It's worse than dysfunctional." Ravel resigned from the FEC on February 19, 2017, effective March 1, 2017.

In 2019, Ravel began a campaign for California state senator. During the campaign, Ravel attracted controversy for her past opposition to the recall of Judge Aaron Persky over his handling of the Brock Turner case including from Michele Dauber who led the petition drive for the recall campaign with Dauber and other leaders of the recall campaign releasing an open letter critical of Ravel and her employer attorney James "Jim" McManis who also opposed the recall and claimed Chanel Miller consented to Brock Turner's sexual assault with the letter calling on Ravel to return McManis's $2,000 campaign donation. McManis told a Vogue reporter that "This woman (Miller) was not attacked...". Ravel said she only defended Persky against the recall "on principle" and still supports the campaign against the recall's "underlying cause". Democratic Activists for Women Now (DAWN) then voted to rescind its endorsement of Ravel as a result of refusing to return McManis's campaign donation and her opposition to Proposition 15.

Ravel also received criticism, mainly from rival candidate Nora Campos, from receiving campaign donations from insurance companies and related PACs such as the Personal Insurance Federation of California Agents & Employees PAC and the Liberty Mutual Insurance Company Federal PAC despite Ravel insisting she would run a grassroots campaign and thus wouldn't accept contributions from PACs such as the campaign donations in question.

On March 3, 2020, in California's jungle primary concurrent with then presidential Super Tuesday primaries, Ravel placed in 2nd place and thus was able to move on to the general election with then-Santa Clara County Supervisor for District 3 Dave Cortese placing in 1st place. But in the general elections, Ravel lost to Cortese.

Ravel endorsed Betty Yee in the 2026 California gubernatorial election.

== See also ==
- List of first women lawyers and judges in California
