= Steven T. Walther =

American attorney (1943–2026)

Chair of the Federal Election Commission
- In office January 1, 2017 – December 31, 2017
- President: Barack Obama; Donald Trump
- Preceded by: Matthew S. Petersen
- Succeeded by: Caroline C. Hunter
- In office January 1, 2009 – December 31, 2009
- President: George W. Bush; Barack Obama
- Preceded by: Don McGahn
- Succeeded by: Matthew S. Petersen

Commissioner of the Federal Election Commission
- In office June 27, 2008 – August 1, 2022
- President: George W. Bush; Barack Obama; Donald Trump; Joe Biden
- Preceded by: Scott Thomas
- Succeeded by: Dara Lindenbaum
- In office January 10, 2006 – December 31, 2007
- President: George W. Bush

Personal details
- Born: July 18, 1943 Reno, Nevada, U.S.
- Died: August 27, 2026 (aged 83) Carson City, Nevada, U.S.
- Party: Independent
- Education: University of Notre Dame (BA); University of California, Berkeley (JD)

Steven T. Walther (July 18, 1943 – September 27, 2026) was an American attorney who served as a commissioner of the Federal Election Commission. Walther also served as chair of the FEC in 2009 and 2017.

== Early life and education ==
Walther was born in Reno, Nevada on July 18, 1943. He earned a Bachelor of Arts degree in Russian from the University of Notre Dame in 1965 and a Juris Doctor from the UC Berkeley School of Law in 1968.

== Career ==
Walther was a former president of the State Bar of Nevada, the Western States Bar Conference, and the National Caucus of State Bar Associations. He was a past chair of the Fellows of the American Bar Foundation, the legal research arm of the ABA. From 1971 until his FEC appointment, Walther served as a member of the Nevada State Advisory Committee to the United States Commission on Civil Rights.

Prior to joining the FEC, Walther practiced law in the Reno, Nevada law firm of Walther, Key, Maupin, Oats, Cox & LeGoy, now known as Maupin, Cox & LeGoy which he co-founded in 1972.

During his legal career, Walther has been active in professional legal and judicial organizations and activities, as well as numerous civic activities. He was a former member of the Board of Governors of the American Bar Association and served as co-chair of the ABA Center for Human Rights. He has been active in ABA initiatives focusing on international relations, human rights and the rule of law. He was appointed by the ABA President to serve as the ABA Representative to the United Nations. He served on the executive board of the ABA Central European and Eurasian Law Initiative (CEELI), which oversees the ABA's democracy building programs in over 21 countries–programs which promote development of fair and open election laws. He has been a member of the board of trustees and lecturer for the National Judicial College, both in the United States and in Russia. Walther has lectured extensively, both domestically and internationally (principally in Russia), on rule of law, human rights, litigation and international law issues. He was a member of the American Law Institute and the International Bar Association.

=== Federal Election Commission ===
Walther was first sworn in as a commissioner of the Federal Election Commission on January 10, 2006, as a recess appointee. Although his name was placed before the United States Senate for confirmation in June, 2007, his recess term expired on December 31, 2007, before the Senate acted. On June 24, 2008, he was confirmed unanimously by the Senate and sworn in on June 27 as a commissioner, to resume the balance of his statutory term.

In January 2022, Dara Lindenbaum was nominated by President Joe Biden to succeed Walther as a commissioner of the FEC. She was confirmed by the Senate on May 24, 2022, and sworn in on August 2, 2022.

== Death ==
Steven Walther died in Carson City, Nevada on September 27, 2026, at the age of 83. He was survived by his wife, Helen Diane, three children, and seven grandchildren.
