= Federal Election Commission =

United States campaign finance agency

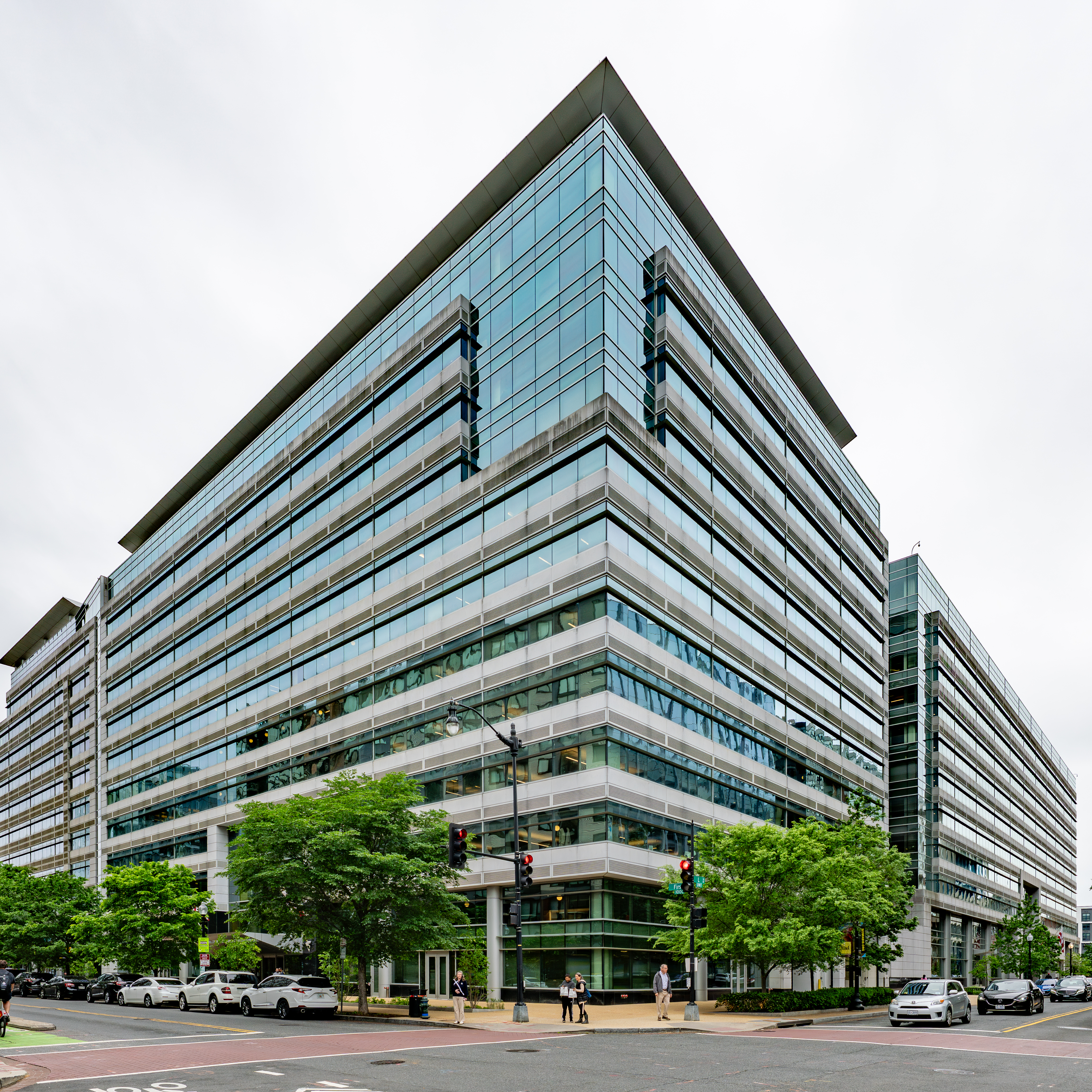
- Headquarters in Washington, D.C.

Agency overview
- Formed: October 15, 1974; 52 years ago
- Jurisdiction: Federal government of the United States
- Status: Independent regulatory agency
- Headquarters: 1050 First St NE Washington, D.C., U.S.
- Employees: 509 (2018)
- Annual budget: $74.5 million USD (FY 2022)
- Agency executives: Shana M. Broussard, Chair; Vacant, Vice Chair
- Key document: Federal Election Campaign Act Amendments of 1974 (Pub. L. 93–443 88 Stat. 1263)
- Website: www.fec.gov

The Federal Election Commission (FEC) is an independent agency of the United States federal government that enforces federal campaign finance laws and oversees federal elections of the United States. Created in 1974 through amendments to the Federal Election Campaign Act, the commission describes its duties as "to disclose campaign finance information, to enforce the provisions of the law such as the limits and prohibitions on contributions, and to oversee the public funding of Presidential elections." It is led by six commissioners who are nominated by the president and confirmed by the Senate.

Under the first Trump administration the commission was unable to function from late August 2019 to December 2020, except for the period of May 2020 to July 2020, due to lack of a quorum. In December 2020, three commissioners were appointed to restore a quorum; however, due to back log some cases exceeded a five-year statute of limitations and died for lack of commission action. Also deadlocks arising from the equal number of members from the Republican and Democratic parties with the absence of a tie-breaking vote resulted in some controversial investigations not being pursued.

Under the second Trump administration, the FEC again became inoperative starting on May 1, 2025 due to a lack of quorum.

== History and membership ==
=== History ===
The FEC was established in 1974, in an amendment of the Federal Election Campaign Act (FECA), to enforce and regulate campaign finance law. Initially, its six members were to be appointed by both houses of the United States Congress and the US president, reflecting a strong desire for Congress to retain control. Two commissioners were to be appointed by the president pro tempore of the Senate and two by the speaker of the House of Representatives, each upon recommendation by the respective majority and minority leaders in that chamber, and the last two appointed by the president. They were to be confirmed by both Houses of Congress, rather than only by the Senate.

The appointment process was invalidated in 1976, in Buckley v. Valeo, when the Supreme Court held that the commissioners of the FEC were "Officers of the United States" under the Appointments Clause, and must be nominated by the president and confirmed by the Senate. Congress then amended the FECA to comply with Buckley and now the six FEC commissioners are nominated by the president and confirmed by the Senate.

Since 1990, the FEC has grown more polarized, with considerable deadlocks in decision-making. The FEC has shut down because of lack of quorum in 2008 under George W. Bush administration, as well as in 2019, 2020 and 2025 under Donald Trump .

=== Commissioners ===
The commission consists of six commissioners appointed by the president and confirmed by the Senate. Each commissioner is appointed for a six-year term, but each ending on April 30. Two commissioners are appointed every two years. However, commissioners continue to serve after their terms would expire until a replacement is confirmed, but may resign at any time. By law, no more than three commissioners can be members of the same political party.

The chair of the commission rotates among the commissioners each year, with no commissioner serving as chair more than once during a six-year term. However, a commissioner may serve as chair more than once if they serve beyond the six-year mark and no successor is appointed; for example, Ellen L. Weintraub (Democratic) was chair in 2003, 2013, 2019, and 2025.

As of 2025 the salary of a commissioner was $158,500 per year.

=== During the Trump administrations ===
Donald Trump assumed his first presidency of the United States on January 20, 2017.

The commission had fewer than six commissioners for several years after the resignation of Ann Ravel (Democratic) in March 2017. Trump nominated James E. Trainor III (Republican) on September 14, 2017, for a term expiring on April 30, 2023, to enable replacement for Lee Goodman (Republican), who resigned in February 2018, creating a second vacancy. When Matthew Petersen (Republican) resigned on August 31, 2019, the commission had only three commissioners, and was unable to conduct most of its regulatory and decision-making functions due to lack of a quorum. In the absence of a quorum, the commission could not vote on complaints or give guidance through advisory opinions. As of May 19, 2020, there were 350 outstanding matters on the agency's enforcement docket and 227 items waiting for action.

Trainor was confirmed by the Senate on May 19, 2020, restoring the commission's quorum of four. One meeting was held online, due to the coronavirus pandemic, on June 18, 2020. On June 25, however, Caroline Hunter (Republican) resigned, effective July 3, with the result that the commission once again lacked a quorum. On December 9, three new members were confirmed by the Senate.

Donald Trump assumed his second presidency of the United States on January 20, 2025.

Trump fired Ellen L. Weintraub on February 6, 2025; Weintraub has rejected the action, arguing that her removal was unlawful and ultra vires.

Since May 1, 2025 the FEC has been defunct with 3 or fewer commissioners. Ann Ravel stated that "Trump wants to purposely leave the FEC without a quorum because of the very high number of complaints filed with the FEC about his improper financing.

On 1 July 2025 Shana M. Broussard became chair for the rest of the year, following her election to the role in April. Trainor, previously acting chair became vice-chair.

== Official duties ==
=== Duties ===
The FEC enforces and regulates federal campaign finance laws. It enforces limitations and prohibitions on contributions and expenditures, administers the reporting system for campaign finance disclosure, investigates and prosecutes violations (investigations are typically initiated by complaints from other candidates, parties, watchdog groups, and the public), audits a limited number of campaigns and organizations for compliance, and administers the presidential public funding programs for presidential candidates.

Until 2014, the FEC was also responsible for regulating the nomination of conventions and defends the statute in challenges to federal election laws and regulations.

The FEC also publishes reports, filed in the Senate, House of Representatives and presidential campaigns, that list how much each campaign has raised and spent, and a list of all donors over $200, along with each donor's home address, employer and job title. This database also goes back to 1980. Under the Federal Election Campaign Act, information about individual contributors taken from FEC reports cannot be sold or used for soliciting political or charitable contributions, or for any commercial purpose. This restriction applies only to the use of individual contributor information, and does not apply to candidate committees, party committees, or political action committees. The FEC authorizes reporting committees to include up to ten fictitious records as a means to detect data misuse. The FEC also maintains an active program of public education, directed primarily to explaining the law to the candidates, their campaigns, political parties and other political committees that it regulates.

=== Procedures and deadlock ===
The most significant powers of the FEC require an affirmative vote. These powers include the ability to conduct investigations, report misconduct to law enforcement, pursue settlements with candidates, and to bring a civil action in court to enforce campaign finance regulations. The FEC can also publish advisory opinions on campaign finance issues and issue campaign finance regulations.

Under the statute, there is an even number of commissioners with no more than three commissioners being members of the same political party. However, there is no tie-breaking process, such as by the chair. In addition, there is a quorum requirement of four commissioners. This results in four of the six commissioners being required for a FEC decision, which in turn means that on controversial issues bipartisan support is required for a decision. Critics have argued that the even number of commissioners and the supermajority requirement was a "set up for deadlock and political shenanigans," especially in an age of polarization.

Between 1996 and 2006, the FEC tied in only 2.4% of Matters Under Review (MURs). In 2008 and 2009, such deadlocks spiked to 13% and to 24.4% in 2014. By 2016, commissioners deadlocked on more than 30% of substantive votes and consequently enforcement intensity decreased significantly.

== Criticism ==
=== Campaign finance ===
Critics of the FEC, including many former commissioners and campaign finance reform supporters, have harshly complained of the FEC's impotence, and accused it of succumbing to regulatory capture where it serves the interests of the ones it was intended to regulate. The FEC's bipartisan structure, which was established by Congress, renders the agency "toothless." Critics also claim that most FEC penalties for violating election law come well after the actual election in which they were committed. Additionally, some critics claim that the commissioners tend to act as an arm of the "regulated community" of parties, interest groups, and politicians when issuing rulings and writing regulations. Others point out, however, that the commissioners rarely divide evenly along partisan lines, and that the response time problem may be endemic to the enforcement procedures established by Congress. To complete steps necessary to resolve a complaint – including time for defendants to respond to the complaint, time to investigate and engage in legal analysis, and finally, where warranted, prosecution – necessarily takes far longer than the comparatively brief period of a political campaign.

While campaigning in the 2018 United States House of Representatives elections in New York, Democratic primary candidate Liuba Grechen Shirley used campaign funds to pay a caregiver for her two young children. The FEC ruled that federal candidates can use campaign funds to pay for childcare costs that result from time spent running for office. Grechen Shirley became the first woman in history to receive approval to spend campaign funds on childcare.

=== First Amendment issues ===
Critics including former Republican FEC chairman Bradley Smith and Stephen M. Hoersting, former executive director of the Center for Competitive Politics, criticize the FEC for pursuing overly aggressive enforcement theories that they believe amount to an infringement on the First Amendment right to free speech.

Division over the issue became especially prominent during the last several years of the Obama administration. Commissioners deadlocked on several votes over whether to regulate Twitter, Facebook, and other online mediums for political speech, as well as a vote to punish Fox News for the selection criteria it used in a presidential debate.

=== Deadlocks ===
Critics of the commission also argue that the membership structure regularly causes deadlocks on 3-3 votes. Since 2008, 3-3 votes have become more common at the FEC. From 2008 to August 2014, the FEC has had over 200 tie votes, accounting for approximately 14 percent of all votes in enforcement matters.

On May 6, 2021, the FEC closed an inquiry into whether the payment to Stormy Daniels by Donald Trump violated campaign financial law during the 2016 election. The FEC voted 2-2, between Democrats and Republicans, against a motion to take further action. Republican Vice Chairman Allen Dickerson recused himself, while independent Commissioner Steven Walther did not vote.

Similarly, in June 2021, the FEC found that National Enquirer violated US election laws and $150,000 paid by AMI to Karen McDougal amounted to an illegal campaign contribution. Publisher AMI agreed to a fine of $187,500. However, the FEC divided 3-3 on party lines on a motion to pursue further investigation into Donald Trump, thus closing the investigation.

In June 2023, the FEC deadlocked over requests to create guidelines for campaign advertisements which use content generated by artificial intelligence. The vote failed 3-3 with all Republican commissioners voting against the request and all Democratic commissioners voting in favor, with Republican commissioner Allen Dickerson arguing that the agency did not have the authority to regulate such advertisements."

== Commissioners ==
=== Current ===
Position	Name	Party	Appointed by	Sworn in	Term expires
Chair	Shana M. Broussard	Democratic	Donald Trump	December 15, 2020	April 30, 2023 (Note: Term expired—serving until replaced. A replacement's term would expire April 30, 2029.)
Commissioner	Dara Lindenbaum	Democratic	Joe Biden	August 2, 2022	April 30, 2027
Commissioner	Vacant				April 30, 2027
Commissioner	Vacant				April 30, 2029
Commissioner	Vacant				April 30, 2031
Commissioner	Vacant				April 30, 2031

=== Nominations ===
President Trump has nominated the following to fill seats on the board. They await Senate confirmation.

Name	Party	Term expires	Replacing
Ashley Stow	Republican	April 30, 2029	James E. Trainor III
Andrew Woodson	Republican	April 30, 2031	Allen Dickerson

== Former commissioners and chairmen ==
- Joan D. Aikens – April 1975 – September 1998 (reappointed May 1976, December 1981, August 1983 and October 1989).
- Thomas B. Curtis – April 1975 – May 1976.
- Thomas E. Harris – April 1975 – October 1986 (reappointed May 1976 and June 1979).
- Neil O. Staebler – April 1975 – October 1978 (reappointed May 1976).
- Vernon W. Thomson – April 1975 – June 1979; January 1981 – December 1981 (reappointed May 1976).
- Robert Tiernan – April 1975 – December 1981 (reappointed May 1976).
- William L. Springer – May 1976 – February 1979.
- John Warren McGarry – October 1978 – August 1998 (reappointed July 1983 and October 1989).
- Max Friedersdorf – March 1979 – December 1980.
- Frank P. Reiche – July 1979 – August 1985.
- Lee Ann Elliott – December 1981 – June 2000 (reappointed July 1987 and July 1994).
- Danny L. McDonald – December 1981 – January 2006 (reappointed in July 1987, July 1994 and July 2000).
- Thomas J. Josefiak – August 1985 – December 1991.
- Scott E. Thomas – October 1986 – January 2006 (reappointed in November 1991 and July 1998).
- Trevor Potter – November 1991 – October 1995.
- Darryl R. Wold – July 1998 – April 2002.
- Karl J. Sandstrom – July 1998 – December 2002.
- David M. Mason – July 1998 – July 2008.
- Bradley A. Smith – May 2000 – August 2005.
- Michael E. Toner – March 2002 – March 2007. (by recess appointment on March 29, 2002, confirmed to full term 2003)
- Ellen Weintraub – December 2002 – February 2025. (by recess appointment on December 6, 2002, confirmed to full term 2003), termination disputed
- Robert D. Lenhard – January 2006 – December 2007. (by recess appointment on January 4, 2006)
- Hans A. von Spakovsky – January 2006 – December 2007. (by recess appointment on January 4, 2006)
- Steven T. Walther – January 2006 – December 2007 (by recess appointment on January 4, 2006), June 2008 — August 2022. (later confirmed to full term)
- Cynthia L. Bauerly – June 2008 – February 2013.
- Matthew S. Petersen – June 2008 – August 2019.
- Caroline C. Hunter – June 2008 – July 2020.
- Don McGahn – July 2008 – September 2013.
- Lee E. Goodman – October 2013 – February 2018.
- Ann Ravel – October 2013 – March 2017.
- Sean J. Cooksey – December 2020 – January 2025.
- Allen Dickerson – December 2020 – April 2025.
- James E. Trainor III – June 2020 – October 2025.

== See also ==
- Bipartisan Campaign Reform Act
- Campaign finance in the United States
- Dark Money (film)
- Election Assistance Commission
- Elections in the United States
- Federal Election Campaign Act
- International Foundation for Electoral Systems
- Title 11 of the Code of Federal Regulations
- Shadow campaigns in the United States

=== Case law ===
- Buckley v. Valeo, 424 U.S. 1 (1976)
- Federal Election Commission v. Akins (1998), authorizing "any party aggrieved by an order of the Commission" to file a suit
- McConnell v. Federal Election Commission (2003)
- Federal Election Commission v. Wisconsin Right to Life, Inc. (2007), holding that issue ads may not be banned before elections
- Davis v. Federal Election Commission (2008)
- Citizens United v. Federal Election Commission (2010)
- McCutcheon v. Federal Election Commission (2014)
