= Chris LaCivita =

American political consultant (born 1966)

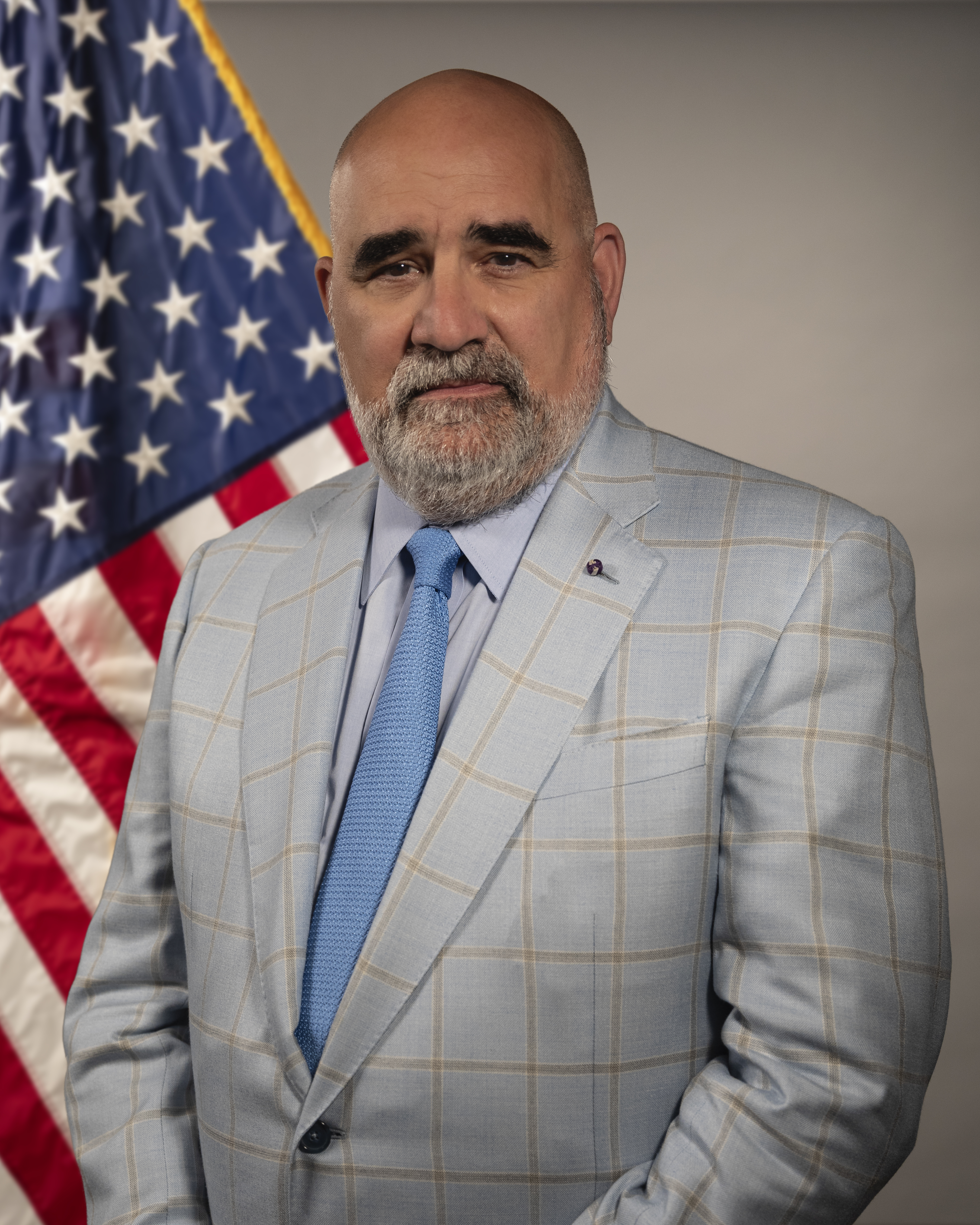
- LaCivita in 2025
- Born: Christopher Joseph LaCivita; 1966 (age 59–60); McKeesport, Pennsylvania, U.S.
- Education: Virginia Commonwealth University (BS)
- Political party: Republican
- Spouse: Catherine
- Children: 2
- Military career
- Allegiance: United States
- Branch: United States Marine Corps
- Service years: c.1989–1991
- Rank: Sergeant
- Conflicts: Gulf War
- Awards: Purple Heart

Christopher Joseph LaCivita (born 1966) is an American political consultant and former partner in FP1 Strategies, a national public affairs and campaign firm. He most recently served as senior adviser to Donald Trump's 2024 presidential campaign.

The Swift Boat Veterans, an independent-expenditure group, was credited with a significant impact on the 2004 presidential election by advancing a sharp attack on John Kerry's military record, described by Mother Jones magazine as a "smear campaign", and by NPR as discredited. Since 2004, he has been president of the firm Advancing Strategies LLC. LaCivita was formerly with Crosslink Strategy, a conservative lobbying and political consulting firm founded by Terry Nelson, a former John McCain advisor, and also a founding partner of FP1.

== Early life and education ==
LaCivita was born in McKeesport, Pennsylvania, and grew up in the Richmond, Virginia, area, graduating from Midlothian High School. His father was a first-generation Italian-American and his mother was a first generation Irish-American.

He received his bachelor's degree in political science from Virginia Commonwealth University in 1989. He joined the United States Marine Corps and was awarded a Purple Heart for wounds sustained during his involvement in the 1991 Coalition invasion of Iraq; he was discharged as a sergeant. After that he taught part-time at Regent University and began a new career as a political consultant.

== Early career in Virginia politics ==
Active in Republican politics following his involvement in the 1991 Coalition invasion of Iraq, LaCivita did field work for George Allen in central Virginia during his 1991 congressional campaign, then went with him to Capitol Hill, serving as a legislative assistant on foreign and defense policy. When Allen ran for Governor of Virginia in 1993, LaCivita organized in the Richmond area, Southside and central Virginia, then was appointed to serve as an assistant secretary of administration.

He left state service in 1995 to help run Allen's political action committee, assisting legislative races that year (wherein the GOP captured a tie in the State Senate). LaCivita was named executive director of the state Republican Party in 1996, after Allen's allies won control of the RPV. LaCivita ran the state party organization, as Jim Gilmore succeeded Allen as governor in 1997, acting as overseer of 'internal squabbles,' but going on later to capture control of both houses of the General Assembly in 1999.

LaCivita and former gubernatorial chief of staff Jay Timmons worked on Allen's successful campaign in the 2000 Senate election against two-term Democrat Chuck Robb, a race he won with 52% of the vote.

In 2001, LaCivita was drafted in the final two months to shore up the losing campaign of Republican Attorney General Mark Earley for governor against Democrat Mark Warner. As Fred Barnes wrote:

"Earley wasted the summer and didn't find a message until September -- after party officials dispatched Chris LaCivita, the political director of the National Republican Senatorial Committee, to run his campaign. The message, it turns out, is a hardy perennial for Republicans: taxes."

Earley, down by 13 points in mid-summer, closed the gap late in the campaign but eventually lost by five points, 52%-47%, to Warner.

== National political career ==
=== Early 2000s ===
During the 2002 midterm elections, LaCivita served as the political director of the National Republican Senatorial Committee (NRSC) under the chairmanship of Senator Bill Frist. That November, the GOP scored a net gain of two Senate seats, recapturing control of the upper chamber.

While at the NRSC, LaCivita was the direct supervisor of James Tobin, another former employee of the DCI Group. In 2005, Tobin was sentenced to 10 months in federal prison for his role in the 2002 NH phone jamming scandal for his activities during that campaign; LaCivita was on Tobin's witness list but never called. Democrats, who sought testimony from LaCivita for a civil suit tied to the same incident, recently settled that civil suit out of court. Tobin's conviction was overturned on appeal.

In 2003, LaCivita served as president of Progress for America, later giving that role to former DCI employee Brian McCabe while LaCivita became its executive director. LaCivita at one time worked for the Republican political consulting firm DCI Group, which had close ties both to Progress for America and Swift Boat Veterans for Truth.

==== Swift boat advertisement campaign ====
During the 2004 US presidential campaign, LaCivita served as consultant and principal media advisor to the Swift Boat Veterans, writing and producing the group's memorable (and controversial) television commercials in association with Rick Reed, a group financed by Texas multimillionaires T. Boone Pickens, Bob J. Perry, and Harlan Crow via the Progress for America Voter Fund. The advertisements falsely attacked John Kerry's military record. They were contradicted by Kerry's crewmen and Navy records. The discredited campaign led to the term "swiftboating" entering the political vocabulary to define smear campaigns.

=== Later 2000s ===
At the same time he consulted for "Swift Boat Veterans for Truth", LaCivita consulted for the NRSC, now headed by former client George Allen, as it scored a net gain of four Senate seats in the 2004 cycle.

LaCivita continued his independent-expenditure work in 2005, producing ads in support of Virginia Attorney General Jerry Kilgore in his unsuccessful gubernatorial campaign.

In 2005 and 2006, LaCivita was a senior strategist for Vern Buchanan, who won a contested primary and general election in Florida's 13th congressional district by less than 400 votes. In the 2006 Florida gubernatorial election, LaCivita ran an independent organization, Floridians for a Better and Brighter Future, in support of Charlie Crist's Republican primary campaign against Tom Gallagher. In 2006, LaCivita was a general consultant for Bob Corker's successful campaign for Senate in Tennessee. As Corker lagged in the polls behind Democratic opponent Harold Ford, LaCivita was later replaced by Tom Ingram who engineered a late-in-the-game turnaround to narrowly win the general election. In 2007, LaCivita told reporters that the GOP could silence the press uproar over the sudden dismissal of eight US Attorneys by promoting stories about the most extreme among anti-Bush activists. "When are we going to make it about Code Pink and the rest of the liberal weirdos controlling the Democrat agenda?" he asked. That fall, he guided Jill Holtzman Vogel to her initial victory in the Winchester-based Virginia State Senate contest.

During the 2008 presidential campaign, LaCivita and Tony Feather launched a new 501(c)4 issues advocacy group, the American Issues Project, after a series of meetings with other Swift Boat donors. In August 2008, AIP began airing ads in battleground states seeking to raise questions about Democratic Party presidential nominee Senator Barack Obama's ties to former student radical William Ayers. The American Issues Project had a sole donor, Harold Simmons, an 87-year-old Dallas billionaire who was also a principal donor, along with T. Boone Pickens, to the Swiftboat Veterans for Truth PAC. On October 10, 2008, a campaign finance watchdog group, Democracy 21, filed a complaint with the Federal Election Commission about the group's alleged violations of election campaign law. In 2009 AIP aired a second national TV spot (colloquially called the "Jesus" ad) targeting the Obama stimulus package as unprecedented in its size and wastefulness. The spots were produced by Larry McCarthy under LaCivita's direction.

In 2009, LaCivita was the general strategist for State Senator Ken Cuccinelli's successful bid for Attorney General of Virginia. He also guided Jeffrey McWaters to victory in a December special election for Virginia State Senate, occasioned by the departure of longtime incumbent Ken Stolle in Virginia Beach.

=== 2010s ===
In the summer of 2010, LaCivita returned to the NRSC as its political director, the same post he held in 2002. Under his direction, the GOP scored a net gain of five Senate seats in the November 2010 general elections. Throughout 2010, LaCivita consulted for several GOP congressional campaigns, most prominently that of State Senator Robert Hurt who was elected in Virginia's 5th Congressional District over Democratic incumbent Tom Perriello. LaCivita aided businessman Scott Rigell in his successful bid for election in Virginia's 2nd Congressional District over incumbent Glenn Nye. But his client in Missouri's 3rd congressional district, Ed Martin, fell short in his bid to unseat Democratic Rep. Russ Carnahan.

In 2011, Virginia Republicans succeeded in ousting two Democratic State Senators, gaining a 20–20 tie (and an effective majority with GOP Lieutenant Governor Bill Bolling acting in their favor). LaCivita was the strategist for Bill Stanley, who defeated longtime Democratic incumbent Roscoe Reynolds in a race between two Southwest Virginia senators thrown together by redistricting. Stanley prevailed by a margin of 644 votes, 46.80% to 45.54%. LaCivita helmed the 2012 Senatorial campaign of Linda McMahon in Connecticut, losing to Congressman Chris Murphy. At the same time, he guided Robert Hurt to his first re-election in Virginia's 5th Congressional District, defeating challenger John Douglass by 12 points. LaCivita was a consultant to black conservative Congressman Allen West of Florida, who was defeated for re-election in a heavily redistricted seat.

LaCivita was the chief strategist for the 2013 gubernatorial campaign of longtime client Ken Cuccinelli in Virginia. The conservative Attorney General, heavily outspent and behind in every public survey from July to November, battled to a surprisingly close finish against former Democratic Party chair Terry McAuliffe, losing 45.2% to 47.7%, a margin of 56,000 votes of 2.2 million cast. Afterwards, LaCivita blamed the October 2013 government shutdown for slowing Cuccinelli's momentum in the final weeks, while praising the support received from the Republican National Committee and the Republican Governors Association. In September 2014, Senate Republicans tapped LaCivita and his ally, Corry Bliss, to rescue the faltering campaign of incumbent Pat Roberts in Kansas, facing a serious challenge from Independent candidate Greg Orman (following the withdrawal of the Democratic nominee, in what was heretofore a three-way general-election contest). Roberts, behind or even with Orman in nearly all opinion polls that fall, won re-election with a surprisingly strong 53.1% to Orman's 42.5%. However, LaCivita's House candidate in Northern California, Doug Ose, fell just short of victory after a protracted count, losing by 1,400 votes to incumbent Ami Bera.

In January 2015, LaCivita was named a senior adviser to the exploratory presidential campaign of Senator Rand Paul. Paul suspended his campaign in February 2016, after finishing in fifth place out of 12 Republican candidates at the Iowa caucuses.

In April 2016, the Republican National Committee hired LaCivita as a senior adviser for what was expected to be a fractious National Convention in Cleveland. His longtime former Virginia client, Ken Cuccinelli, plotted a floor challenge to disrupt Donald Trump's path to the nomination. Working for RNC Chair Reince Priebus, LaCivita and others were instrumental in shutting down the "Never Trump" movement's floor challenge on the first day of the convention. According to Kyle Cheney of Politico, "The RNC and Trump campaign whips [went] to work. With the lists of insurgent delegates in hand, dozens of aides worked the convention floor for about 15 minutes, collecting their own set of withdrawal signatures. In the end, four of the initial 11 states saw enough delegates abandon the roll call effort to scuttle it." That November and December, LaCivita served as a national GOP liaison to Republicans named to the Electoral College. LaCivita was Pat McCrory's strategist in his unsuccessful 2016 campaign for reelection as Governor of North Carolina. McCrory, outspent 2-to-1, lost by just 10,000 votes, 48.8% to 49.0% (confirmed only after a recount) to Democrat Roy Cooper. In 2017, LaCivita was hired as a general consultant to the Kim Guadagno campaign for governor in New Jersey shortly before her victory in the Republican primary. Guadagno was defeated in the fall, part of the Democratic sweep in the Garden State.

During 2017 and 2018, LaCivita served as a consultant to the American Action Network and Congressional Leadership Fund, the SuperPAC allied with GOP Speaker Paul Ryan, reuniting with longtime campaign partner Corry Bliss. In that capacity, he led several Independent Expenditure campaigns in House races, including GOP victories for Will Hurd (Texas's 23rd Congressional District) and Andy Barr (Kentucky 6th Congressional). He was also a general consultant to Anthony Gonzalez, the former NFL wide receiver and Stanford graduate who won the Republican nomination and was elected Congressman from Ohio's 16th Congressional District. In 2018, LaCivita advised Republican businessman and academic Bob Stefanowski in his insurgent campaign for governor of Connecticut. First-time candidate Stefanowski triumphed unexpectedly, skipping the state GOP convention and qualifying for the primary by petition (the first candidate in state history to do so). Stefanowski won the nomination in the contested five-way primary. Running close in polls throughout the fall despite the anti-Trump tide in a Democratic state, Stefanowski was defeated 46.2% to Ned Lamont's 49.4%.

LaCivita joined FP1 in January 2019.

=== 2020s ===
On August 31, 2020, LaCivita was announced as head of Preserve America, a new pro-Trump superPAC that began a $30 million advertising blitz in early September, focusing initially on the swing states of Florida, North Carolina, Pennsylvania, Wisconsin, Arizona, Iowa, and Georgia. In 2022, he was the general consultant for Ron Johnson's re-election bid for United States Senator from Wisconsin. LaCivita most recently served as a senior advisor on Donald Trump's successful 2024 presidential campaign.

As of 2023, LaCivita was the chief strategist of Trump's MAGA Inc. Super PAC. In March 2024, LaCivita also became Chief Operating Officer of the Republican National Committee.

==== Arlington National Cemetery incident ====
On August 27, 2024, an incident occurred at Arlington National Cemetery in which two Trump staffers, Justin Caporale and Michel Picard, shoved a female cemetery employee who was trying to stop the Trump team from photographing and filming a campaign promotion in a heavily restricted area of the cemetery known as Section 60, which is primarily reserved for veterans of the Iraq and Afghanistan wars. A federal law prohibits the use of U.S. military facilities, cemeteries in particular, for political campaigns.

LaCivita called the cemetery employee a “despicable individual” and, in response to a rebuke from the U.S. Army, posted a video on Twitter "hoping to trigger the hacks” at the Office of the Army Secretary.

=== 2025 Albanian parliamentary election ===
In 2025, LaCivita advised Albania’s Democratic Party and its leader Sali Berisha ahead of national elections. Party spokesperson Alfred Lela highlighted parallels between Berisha and Trump, both portrayed as embattled political figures facing establishment resistance. LaCivita publicly supported Berisha despite his U.S. blacklist designation over alleged corruption, stating his aim to "make Albania great again." Berisha, previously Albania’s president and prime minister, regained control of the party in 2024 after internal legal battles. His campaign against Prime Minister Edi Rama marked a bid to end 12 years of Socialist Party rule.

== Personal life ==
LaCivita lives outside Richmond, Virginia, with his wife, Catherine, and their two children.

LaCivita's daughter Victoria was hired in January 2025 by the White House Office of Science and Technology Policy as communications director.
