= American Issues Project =

American political action group

The American Issues Project is an American political action group organized as a 501(c)(4) nonprofit, so that it can engage in limited amounts of civic campaigning, but cannot legally advocate for or against candidates. During the 2008 United States presidential election, it became known for commercials linking Barack Obama to former Weather Underground founder William Ayers. The group has received substantial media attention. After Obama came into office, the group concentrated on the American Recovery and Reinvestment Act of 2009.

The AIP was co-founded by conservative political activists Tony Feather (also a co-founder of the conservative 527 group Progress for America) and Chris LaCivita.

Funding for AIP, which spent close to $3 million for the Ayers ads, is provided by Harold Simmons, who previously gave $3 million to fund Swift Boat Veterans for Truth and another $500,000 to Progress for America.

== See also ==
- RightChange.com
- The Committee for Truth in Politics
