= 2002 New Hampshire Senate election phone jamming scandal =

Election phone jamming scandal

The 2002 New Hampshire Senate election phone jamming scandal involved the use of a telemarketing firm hired by that state's Republican Party (NHGOP) for election tampering. The tampering involved using a call center to jam the phone lines of a get out the vote (GOTV) operation. In the end, 900 calls were made for 45 minutes of disruption to the Democratic-leaning call centers.

During that state's 2002 election for the United States Senate seat being vacated by Republican Bob Smith, the NHGOP hired GOP Marketplace, based in northern Virginia, to jam another phone bank being used by the state Democratic Party and the firefighters' union for efforts to turn out voters on behalf of then-Governor of New Hampshire Jeanne Shaheen on Election Day. John E. Sununu, the Republican nominee, won a narrow victory. In addition to criminal prosecutions, disclosures in the case have come from a civil suit filed by the state's Democratic Party against the state's Republican Party (now settled).

Four men were convicted of, or pleaded guilty to, federal crimes and sentenced to prison for their involvement. One conviction was reversed by an appeals court. James Tobin, freed on appeal, was later indicted on charges of lying to the FBI during the original investigation.

== Events ==
=== Scandal breaks ===
Police in Concord, the state capital, were notified by Democratic workers on the day of the election that they were receiving repeated telephone calls, terminating after five seconds, which were interfering with their efforts to reach voters and offer rides to the polls. For at least an hour and a half at midday they were unable to make any outgoing calls. Verizon was later able to stop most of these calls, but whoever had made them had violated state laws against telephone harassment.

State authorities found the calls came from out of state, and so brought in their federal counterparts. They were eventually traced to Mylo Enterprises, a Pocatello, Idaho-based company that ran phone banks.

The New Hampshire Union Leader reported on it February 7, 2003. The story forced the resignation of state GOP executive director Charles McGee shortly afterward, when he admitted lying to the paper. Later, prosecutors said that he had come up with the idea of disrupting Democratic communications after seeing a flyer put out by the Shaheen campaign with the numbers. Drawing on his military background, he decided to disrupt "enemy communications" and called several telemarketing firms he knew to have Republican sympathies.

However, James Tobin, then Northeast field director for the National Republican Senatorial Committee (NRSC), put McGee in touch with GOP Marketplace, a northern Virginia firm run by Allen Raymond, which had been hired by the New Hampshire party for similar voter-turnout efforts. McGee had lied in claiming to be unaware of this.

Steve Kornacki of politicsnj.com discovered that Raymond, a New Jersey native, had worked for James Treffinger, a former gubernatorial candidate then under indictment for a phone scandal during that state's 2001 Republican primary for the senatorial nomination, in which calls were made smearing two of his opponents. A prominent figure in that indictment, possibly a co-conspirator, was an unnamed Republican consultant believed to be Raymond (during the later trial of James Tobin, the prosecution said that GOP Marketplace had worked for a Senate campaign in New Jersey and that that work had led to a criminal indictment). During Super Bowl XXXVI on February 3, 2002, Raymond's firm had placed calls to prospective voters that not only attacked one of Treffinger's rivals but purported to be from another.

=== Guilty pleas ===
Little was heard about the case until June 30, 2004, when Allen Raymond pleaded guilty to several felony charges in federal court in Concord. McGee followed suit the next month. Josh Marshall's blog noted that Todd Hinnen, the prosecutor in Raymond's case, indicated to the court that Raymond had been contacted about the phone jamming idea by "a former colleague who was then an official in a national political organization". Hinnen later indicated that McGee discussed the phone-jamming plan with two other top Republican officials.

In an op-ed for the Concord Monitor, Smith called the phone jamming "an outrage" and deplored the lack of Republican anger over "this despicable action by pathetic political hacks". He also implied that the phone jamming may have denied Shaheen victory.

=== The third man ===
In October, an affidavit filed by the New Hampshire Democratic Party and released to the media contained information that made it possible to identify the third man as Tobin, then serving as the New England regional director for the George W. Bush campaign. He resigned October 15. In December, he was indicted and arraigned on two criminal counts each of conspiring to make harassing telephone calls and aiding and abetting telephone harassment.

=== Sentences ===
On February 8, 2005, Allen Raymond was sentenced to five months in federal prison for his role. A month later, Charles McGee received seven months.

=== James Tobin trial and financing ===
James Tobin refused to cooperate with investigators as his trial approached. During Tobin's trial, questions arose about the source of the money involved in funding the phone jamming and his defense.

In July, the Union Leader reported that one of Tobin's attorneys told the court he was representing the defendant in his capacity as an employee of the Republican National Committee (RNC). Since the RNC had stated that Tobin was acting on his own in a rogue operation, it was asked why they would be paying for his defense.

In August, the RNC finally confirmed that it had spent more than $722,000 for Tobin's defense by the Washington firm of Williams & Connolly. "This support is based on his assurance and our belief that Jim has not engaged in any wrongdoing," a spokesperson told the Associated Press.

The Union Leader reported in February 2006 that the RNC had paid $1.7 million to Williams on the day Tobin was sentenced, for a total of $2.5 million, and would neither confirm nor deny that it was still paying his legal expenses. The RNC's first financial report of 2006 indicated that it by then had spent another $330,000.

Later that year, Tobin's wife was hired by the NRSC as a consultant on the unsuccessful re-election campaign of Rhode Island senator Lincoln Chafee, as Northeast Strategies, a company that listed the Tobins' home as its main address. Despite her lack of any previous experience, she was paid at $300,000.

On August 28, Marshall reported that two Indian tribes, the Agua Caliente Band of Cahuilla Indians and the Mississippi Choctaw, known clients of influential lobbyist Jack Abramoff, himself at the center of a widening scandal, had made $5,000 contributions (the legal maximum) to the NHGOP the week of the election in 2002. Neither was known to have any interest in New Hampshire. Later, staffers for Judd Gregg, New Hampshire's senior senator and also a Republican, explained that they had passed along the checks without his knowledge.

Also unusual was over $600,000 contributed to the Sununu campaign over the final week by the National Republican Congressional Committee, which normally focuses on races in the House and had not shown much interest in previous campaigns by Sununu. Texas congressman and former House majority leader Tom DeLay's Americans for a Republican Majority political action committee (ARMPAC) also contributed $5,000.

On November 10, Judge Steven McAuliffe denied Tobin's last motion to dismiss the conspiracy charges against him, although he said he would consider another motion to dismiss charges that Tobin denied others their right to vote.

Shortly before the trial started, Marshall reported that the state's witness list included Terry Nelson, former political director for the Bush campaign. Nelson had been linked to the scandal involving DeLay's illegal fundraising in Texas.

== James Tobin ==
=== Background ===
James Tobin was President George W. Bush's New England campaign chairman. He was convicted on December 15, 2005, of telephone harassment "for his part in a plot to jam the Democratic Party's phones on Election Day 2002". However, this conviction was later overturned by a federal appeals court and Tobin was acquitted on all charges.

As New England campaign chairman for Bush-Cheney '04 Inc., Tobin stepped down two weeks before the election when state Democrats accused him of involvement in a phone-jamming scheme on Election Day 2002. Tobin was later indicted for conspiracy.

Tobin served as national political director for publisher Steve Forbes' Presidential campaign. He is an employee of the Washington, D.C.-based DCI Group and also has his own consulting firm, Tobin & Co., based in Bangor, Maine. During the 2004 election cycle he was a Bush Ranger, raising at least $200,000 for the Bush 2004 reelection effort.

=== Tobin's alleged involvement in election phone jamming ===
In November 2002, Tobin was regional director of the National Republican Senatorial Committee. On election day, computerized hang-up calls jammed phone lines set up by the New Hampshire Democratic Party and the Manchester firefighters' union. Over 800 phone calls were made to a get-out-the-vote phone bank over the course of two hours. The United States Senate contest in New Hampshire was between Democratic Gov. Jeanne Shaheen and Republican Rep. John E. Sununu. Sununu won by about 20,000 votes.

Tobin and NRSC political director Chris LaCivita had worked together at DCI Group, a Washington GOP lobbying and public relations firm, along with Brian McCabe, a GOP activist who formerly worked in several roles in New Hampshire, including as a campaign manager for former U.S. Rep. Bill Zeliff. At the time, the NRSC was chaired by then-Senate Majority Leader Bill Frist.

Phone records show Tobin made two dozen calls to the White House Office of Political Affairs within a three-day period around Election Day 2002. A number of observers have noted that contact between the White House Office of Political Affairs and presidential campaign staff is historically commonplace for Democratic and Republican administrations.

=== Trial ===
During the summer of 2004, Charles McGee, former executive director of the New Hampshire Republican Party, pleaded guilty to conspiracy and admitted paying $15,600 to an Alexandria, Virginia telemarketing company, GOP Marketplace, that hired another business to make the calls. A co-owner of that firm at the time, Shaun Hansen, was indicted in March. Republican consultant Allen Raymond, GOP Marketplace's former president, also pleaded guilty in the summer to a conspiracy charge in federal court.

Tobin's trial began on December 6, 2005. The first day apparently went well for the defense, when key prosecution witness Chuck McGee seemed to back away from testimony he had agreed to make in exchange for plea bargains.

McGee's testimony suggested that the DCI Group, a powerful public relations firm which publishes the Tech Central Station website and is closely connected to the Republican party, was involved through lawyer and New Hampshire native Brian McCabe. He also said he had talked to Darrell Henry of the American Gas Association, who said that he would keep the phone jamming going after it was officially called off. Henry, McGee said, had offered to keep the operation going with some volunteers from "the chamber". Since Tobin's superior at the NRSC, Chris LaCivita, worked at the time for the United States Chamber of Commerce, it is possible that he, too, had foreknowledge of the plan. He currently works for Terry Nelson's consulting firm, Crosslink Strategy Group.

Raymond said he'd also run the idea past Kenneth Gross, a former associate general counsel at the Federal Election Commission, currently a partner in the powerful firm of Skadden, Arps, Slate, Meagher & Flom.

On December 8, Tobin's defense presented two witnesses and rested. They persuaded McAuliffe to drop one charge and narrow the scope of another.

A week later, the jury convicted him of two counts related to telephone harassment, while acquitting him of the more serious charge of conspiracy to violate voters' rights.

In May 2006, prosecutors asked for a two-year prison sentence. They cited three factors: Tobin's abuse of a public and private trust, the making of multiple calls to multiple victims over a prolonged period of time, and the ultimate purpose of interfering with an election. The first two are specifically addressed by the telephone-harassment statute; the latter is not but, the prosecutors said, so egregious an end that it warranted more severe punishment. Tobin was sentenced on May 17, 2006, to 10 months in prison, two years probation, and $10,000 in fines.

The trial left the New Hampshire Republican Party nearly bankrupt, with only $733.60 in its bank account. Later that year, Democratic candidates upset both of the state's incumbent Republican congressmen.

=== RNC defense ===
In August, the RNC confirmed that it had spent more than $722,000 for Tobin's defense by the Washington, D.C. firm of Williams & Connolly. "This support is based on his assurance and our belief that Jim has not engaged in any wrongdoing", a spokesperson told the Associated Press. The Union Leader reported in February 2006 that the RNC had paid $1.7 million to Williams on the day Tobin was sentenced, for a total of $2.5 million, and would neither confirm nor deny that it was still paying his legal expenses. The RNC's first financial report of 2006 indicated that it by then spent another $330,000.

Later that year, Tobin's wife and her partner, a long time New England political operative, were hired as consultants by Rhode Island senator Lincoln Chafee's re-election campaign, which was ultimately unsuccessful. Tobin, who had worked on two previous high-profile campaigns in Maine, and her partner who had managed six previous campaigns were paid $300,000 to consult on the campaign. Of that, $260,000 went to paying for the mail for the Chafee campaign.

=== Conviction reversed on appeal ===
On December 21, Tobin's lawyers filed documents in U.S. District Court in Concord, New Hampshire, seeking to vacate the jury's verdict and demanding a new trial for Tobin. A month later, a more detailed filing laid out three possible errors:

- McGee and Raymond went ahead with the plan after talking with Tobin, not before, suggesting it was their decision alone.
- Tobin could not be shown to have assented to the element of the plan that called for repeated hangup calls.
- There was no evidence of an agreement to proceed before McGee consulted the NHGOP chair and Raymond sought an attorney's advice.
- All the trial evidence showed was that Tobin referred McGee to Raymond.

On March 20, 2007, Chief Judge Michael Boudin of the 1st U.S. Circuit Court of Appeals in Boston ruled that the statute under which Tobin was convicted "is not a close fit" for what Tobin did, and questioned whether the government showed that Tobin intended to harass. However, it did not void the conviction entirely as Tobin's lawyers sought, saying that conspiracy jurisprudence did not require the level of proof Tobin claimed it did. It remanded it to district court for retrial, believing that a properly instructed jury could possibly return a conviction on the basis of his actions alone. Federal prosecutors said they were reviewing the decision to consider whether to appeal it in turn, or retry.

The court of appeals later affirmed the dismissal of the charges, notwithstanding Tobin's "thoroughly bad" conduct. United States v. Tobin, 552 F.3d 29, 34 (1st Cir. 2009).

=== 2008 Tobin indictment ===
After over a year of no further legal or investigative developments, on October 9, 2008, a federal grand jury in Maine indicted Tobin anew on two counts of making false statements to FBI agents. At that time Shaheen and Sununu were reprising their 2002 race, which Shaheen won. These subsequent charges were summarily dismissed in 2009 after the federal judge in Maine's District Court found them motivated by "vindictive prosecution". The judge held that the government could not overcome the legal presumption that the post-appeal charges arising from the same conduct were "vindictive" under United States v. Goodwin, 457 U.S. 372 (1982) and Bordenkircher v. Hayes, 434 U.S. 357 (1978). That is because the new indictment was returned only after the government lost its appeal in United States v. Tobin, 480 F.3d 53, 54-55 (1st Cir.2007), raising a presumption that new prosecution was a response to Tobin's successful exercise of his appellate rights. See United States v. Tobin, 598 F.Supp.2d 125 (D.Me. 2009). The district court found this to be a due process violation. Id. at 129–132. The Appeals Court later dismissed the prosecution's appeal on the government's own motion.

== Other developments ==
Noel Hillman, who was credited with moving the case to trial as head of the Justice Department's Public Integrity Section, was nominated for a federal judgeship by President Bush in January 2006.

Also that month, the NHGOP filed a countersuit against the state's Democratic Party, alleging that the Democratic lawsuit against them was merely part of a national effort to advance the party's interests in an election year and that the Democrats were abusing the court process to hinder NHGOP's efforts to engage in constitutionally protected political activities. On December 1, the two parties settled for a total of $125,000, payable by the Republicans to the Democrats, in $25,000 annual installments over the next five years. The RNC and NRSC will also each make two $5,000 contributions to charities associated with the Manchester fire and police departments.

Charles McGee served seven months in prison, and now works at campaign school for GOP candidates, run by a Republican political marketing firm.

=== White House connections ===
A Democratic analysis of phone records introduced at Tobin's criminal trial show he made 115 outgoing calls to the White House between September 17 and November 22, 2002. Two dozen of the calls were made from 9:28 a.m. the day before the election through 2:17 a.m. the night after the voting, a three-day period during which the phone jamming operation was finalized, carried out, and then abruptly shut down.

Virtually all the calls to the White House went to the same number, which currently rings inside the political affairs office. In 2002, that office was headed by Ken Mehlman, who later became the chair of the Republican National Committee. The White House declined to say which staffer was assigned that phone number.

The national Republican Party, which has continued to pay millions in legal bills to defend Tobin, says the phone calls involved routine election business and that it was "preposterous" to suggest the calls involved phone jamming. Mehlman said that the calls were simply part of the many he and his assistant made to field operatives in competitive races all over the country during that time period.

Later in April, the state Democratic Party asked Phillip Mangones, the judge presiding over its lawsuit against NHGOP, to allow them to question Mehlman. An activist said Mehlman's explanation that it was routine election-day campaign business is hard to reconcile with records showing Tobin continued to call Mehlman's office long after the election was decided in Sununu's favor. Republican consultant Joe Gaylord accused the Democrats of "trying to stir up crap".

=== Haley Barbour connection ===
On April 28, 2006, the Associated Press reported that Haley Barbour, the former RNC chair now serving as governor of Mississippi, had provided a $250,000 startup loan to GOP Marketplace through his investment company, HELM Partners, in 2000. While he claimed that his involvement ended there and that he had no idea at the time that the company would ever engage in criminal activity, its operating agreement shows that HELM retained a great deal of control over the company through a different class of stock and that Barbour's partner Ed Rogers had, as a result, equal control of the company with Raymond. Further investigations showed that HELM had only been incorporated shortly before GOP Marketplace was started and that the partnership never invested in any other company. Raymond also owned two-thirds of the company despite his initial investment of only $11,700.

== Shaun Hansen ==
On March 27, 2006, Shaun Hansen, the former owner of Mylo, traveled from Idaho to New Hampshire to face one count each of conspiracy to commit telephone harassment and aiding and abetting telephone harassment. Prosecutors allege that he agreed to use his firm to jam six phone numbers with hangup calls on the day of the election for $2,500.

Unlike Tobin, Hansen's defense has not been paid for by any entities associated with the Republican Party. Instead, he was represented by the federal public defender's office. The listing of possible defenses he might employ, as listed in his first filing, suggests he may have been led to believe, by Tobin and others, that the jamming was perfectly legal.

He pleaded guilty and was due to be sentenced in February 2007. Later he withdrew the guilty plea and sentencing was postponed until May 2008. The charges against Hansen were ultimately dismissed by the government.

== Special prosecutor sought ==
On May 12, 2006, U.S. Rep John Conyers (Dem, Michigan) sent a formal request to U.S. Attorney Alberto Gonzales, asking him to name a special prosecutor to investigate the 2002 phone jamming. Conyers, the senior Democrat on the House Judiciary Committee, said an independent counsel was necessary to investigate allegations that White House officials may have been involved in the scheme, pointing out that the US Department of Justice "appears not to be reviewing the extensive contacts between the plotters of the phone jamming and high-level Republican officials."
