= Penguin (character) =

DC Comics supervillain

The Penguin
- The Penguin, as he appears on the cover of Secret Origins Special #1 (August 1989). Art by Brian Bolland.

Publication information
- Publisher: DC Comics
- First appearance: Detective Comics #58 (December 1941)
- Created by: Bill Finger (writer); Bob Kane (artist)

In-story information
- Alter ego: Oswald Chesterfield Cobblepot
- Team affiliations: Iceberg Lounge; Suicide Squad; Secret Society of Super Villains; Injustice League; Super Foes
- Notable aliases: Mr. Boniface; The Gentleman of Crime; Cobblepot; Uncle Pengy; The King of Gotham; Mr. Iceberg
- Abilities: Criminal mastermind; Decently skilled in armed and unarmed combat; Uses high-tech umbrellas equipped with various weapons

The Penguin (Oswald Chesterfield Cobblepot) is a supervillain appearing in American comic books published by DC Comics, primarily as an adversary of the superhero Batman. The character made his first appearance in Detective Comics #58 (December 1941) and was created by Bob Kane and Bill Finger. The Penguin is one of Batman's most enduring enemies, belonging to the collective of adversaries that make up Batman's rogues gallery. The Penguin has repeatedly been named one of the best Batman villains and one of the greatest villains in comics. The Penguin was ranked #51 in IGN's list of the Top 100 Comic Book Villains of All Time.

The Penguin is a Gotham City mobster who fancies himself the "Gentleman of Crime". He is most often seen as a short, fat man with a long nose who wears a monocle, top hat, and morning suit while carrying his signature umbrella, which may conceal a gun, gas sprayer, knife, mini-helicopter or other unconventional tools. The Penguin owns and runs a nightclub called the Iceberg Lounge which provides a cover for his criminal activity.

Batman sometimes uses the nightclub as a source of criminal underworld information. Unlike most of Batman's rogues gallery, the Penguin is completely sane and in full control of his actions. According to his creator Bob Kane, the character was inspired by the advertising mascot of Kool cigarettes in the 1940s--a penguin with a top hat and cane. However, similarities have been found between Penguin's design and the appearance of the Dick Tracy character Broadway Bates, who was introduced in 1932. Co-creator Bill Finger thought that the image of high-society gentlemen in tuxedos was reminiscent of emperor penguins.

The character has been featured in various media adaptations, including feature films, television series, and video games. His live-action portrayals include those by Burgess Meredith in the 1960s Batman television series and its spin-off film, Danny DeVito in the film Batman Returns, Robin Lord Taylor in the television series Gotham, and Colin Farrell in the film The Batman and a self-titled spinoff series. Paul Williams, Tom Kenny, Nolan North, Wayne Knight, Stephen Root, and Elias Toufexis, among others, have voiced Penguin in animation and video games.

== Publication history ==
The Penguin made his first appearance in Detective Comics #58 (December 1941) and was created by Bob Kane and Bill Finger. The character received a solo title as a part of the Dawn of DC initiative, with the book being written by Tom King and drawn by Rafael de Latorre.

Penguin has appeared in these Comics in Chronological order:

- Best of DC #10 (March 1981) The Origin of the Penguin
- Batman Vol. 1 #99 (April 1956): The Golden Eggs
- Batman Vol. 1 #155/2 (May 1963): The Return of the Penguin
- Batman Vol. 1 #169 (February 1965): Partners in Plunder
- Justice League of America #40 (November 1965): Indestructible Creatures of Nightmare Island
- World's Finest Comics #159 (August 1966): The Cape and Cowl Crooks
- Brave and the Bold #68 (October-November 1966: Alias the Bat-Hulk
- Superman's Girl Friend Lois Lane #70 (November 1966): The Catwoman's Black Magic
- Batman Vol. 1 #190 (March 1967): The Penguin Takes a Flyer into the Future
- Batman Vol. 1 #191 (May 1967): The Day Batman Sold Out
- Batman Vol. 1 #200 (March 1968): The Man Who Radiated Fear
- Justice League of America #61 (March 1968): Operation: Jail the Justice League
- Batman Vol. 1 #201 (May 1968): Batman's Gangland Guardians
- Batman Vol. 1 #257 (July-August 1974): Hail Emperor Penguin
- Justice League of America #135 (October 1976): Crisis in Eternity!
- Batman Vol. 1 #287 (May 1977): Batman-Ex--As In Extinct
- Batman Vol. 1 #288 (June 1977): The Little Men's Hall of Fame
- Detective Comics #472 (September 1977): I am the Batman
- Detective Comics #473 (November 1977): The Malay Penguin
- Detective Comics #474 (December 1977): The Deadshot Ricochet
- World's Finest Comics #261 (February-March 1980): Showdown at Gotham City
- Detective Comics #492/4 (July 1980): The First Bird
- Brave and the Bold #166 (September 1980): Requiem for Four Canaries
- Best of DC #10 (March 1981): The Origin of the Penguin
- Brave and the Bold #185 (April 1982): The Falcon's Lair
- Brave and the Bold #186 (May 1982): The Treasure of the Hawk-God's Tomb
- Brave and the Bold #191 (October 1982): Only Angels Have Wings
- Detective Comics #526 (May 1983): All My Enemies Against Me
- Batman Vol. 1 #374 (August 1984): Pieces of Penguin
- Detective Comics #541 (August 1984): C-C-Cold
- Crisis on Infinite Earths #5 (August 1985): Worlds in Limbo
- Crisis on Infinite Earths #9 (December 1985): War Zone
- Batman Vol. 1 #400 (October 1986): Resurrection Night!

== Fictional character biography ==
=== Golden Age ===
Originally known only by his alias, the Penguin first appeared in Gotham City as a skilled thief, sneaking a pair of priceless paintings (valued at $250,000 in 1941 dollars) out of an art museum by hiding the rolled-up canvases in the handle of his umbrella. The Penguin later used the stolen paintings as proof of his underworld acumen to a local mob boss, who allowed him to join his crime family. With the Penguin's planning, the mob pulled off a string of ingenious heists. The "be-monocled bird" and the mobster eventually fell out, leading Penguin to kill him with his umbrella gun. The Penguin became the leader of the mob and attempted to neutralize Batman by framing him for the theft of a statue which Penguin, himself, had stolen. As part of the plot, Penguin actually already owned the statue and was framing Batman and Robin to commit insurance fraud. The Penguin's plans were eventually prevented, but the bandit himself escaped.

Penguin later set himself up as an underworld advisor, selling his foolproof plans to different criminals. When the criminals pulled off a successful heist, Penguin would kill them and steal their loot. To get to the bottom of this caper, Batman posed as a rival criminal called "Bad News Brewster". Despite Penguin realizing that Batman was posing as a criminal, Penguin was brought to justice.

Penguin soon became less violent and began to obsess over birds and umbrellas. After breaking out of prison, Penguin heard that Batman didn't consider him a threatening villain. To prove Batman wrong, Penguin built himself gimmick guns and fishing poles. Batman was able to defeat him with an umbrella.

Penguin is paroled from prison and asked to release his birds as a sign of good will. Penguin proceeds to open up an umbrella company and fools Batman into endorsing his products, which contained special magnets. Following the robbery, Penguin flees to Oasis Beach Island in the Caribbean Sea, where he attempts another umbrella-themed theft before being apprehended by Batman and Robin.

=== Silver Age ===
Born Oswald Chesterfield Cobblepot, the Penguin was bullied as a child for his short, penguin-like appearance. Several stories relate that he was forced, as a child, to always carry an umbrella by his overprotective mother due to his father dying of pneumonia from refusing to take one while going out in the rain. His parents owned a bird shop, where Cobblepot spent most of his time with the birds, seeing them as his only friends, and lavishing them with attention. His love of birds eventually led him to study ornithology in college, only to find out that he knew more about birds than most of his professors did. In some versions, Cobblepot turns to crime after his mother dies and the bird shop, along with all of her birds, is repossessed to pay her debts.

While in prison, Penguin and Joker heard the news that Batman is retiring. This turned out to be a ruse. As Batman was shaking off the effects of Scarecrow's fear pills, Penguin escapes from prison and ends up apprehended by Batman and Robin.

Doctor Destiny manipulates Penguin, Doctor Light, Lex Luthor, Tattooed Man, Cutlass Charlie, Captain Boomerang, Floronic Man, and I.Q. into switching appearances with the Justice League, with Penguin swapping with Batman. The Justice League manage to thwart this plot and apprehend the villains.

The Penguin made his last Silver Age appearance during the last appearance of the Earth-One Batman. After he and a multitude of Batman's enemies are broken out of Arkham Asylum and Gotham State Penitentiary by Ra's al Ghul, the Penguin carries out Ra's' plans to kidnap Batman's friends and allies. Penguin, Joker, Mad Hatter, Cavalier, Deadshot, and Killer Moth attack Gotham City Police Headquarters, but are infuriated when Joker sabotages their attempt to hold Commissioner James Gordon for ransom. A standoff ensues, with Joker on one side and Penguin and Mad Hatter on the other. The Joker quickly subdues both with laughing gas.

=== Post-Crisis ===
Following the rebooting the history of the DC Universe, the Penguin was relegated to sporadic appearances, until writer Alan Grant (who had earlier penned the Penguin origin story "The Killing Peck" in Secret Origins Special #1) and artist Norm Breyfogle brought him back, deadlier than ever.

In this continuity, Oswald Cobblepot is an outcast in his high-society family and their rejection drives him to become a criminal. In keeping with his aristocratic origins, the Penguin pursues his criminal career while wearing formal attire such as a top hat, monocle, and tuxedo, especially of the "white-tie-and-tails" design. He is one of the relatively few villains in Batman's rogues gallery who is sane and in full control of his actions, although still ruthless and capable of extreme violence.

During their run, the Penguin forms a brief partnership with hypnotist Mortimer Kadaver, who helps him fake his own death as a ploy to strike an unsuspecting Gotham, only for Kadaver to include a post-hypnotic suggestion that will leave Penguin back in his comatose state and only able to be awoken by a command that Kadaver alone knows. The Penguin later kills Kadaver, after plugging his own ears with toilet paper so that the hypnotist no longer has power over him. After Batman foils this particular endeavor, the Penguin embarks on one of his grandest schemes ever in the three-part story "The Penguin Affair". Finding Harold Allnut being tormented by two gang members, the Penguin takes in Allnut, showing him kindness in exchange for services. Harold builds a gadget that allows the Penguin to control flocks of birds from miles away, which the Penguin utilizes to destroy radio communications in Gotham and crash a passenger plane. This endeavor, too, is foiled by Batman, who hires Allnut as his mechanic.

The Penguin resurfaces during Jean-Paul Valley's tenure as Batman and is one of the few people to deduce that Valley is not the original Batman. To confirm his theory, he kidnaps Sarah Essen, places her in a death trap set to go off at midnight, and turns himself in, utilizing the opportunity to mock her husband Commissioner Gordon as midnight approaches. An increasingly infuriated Gordon is nearly driven to throw him off the police headquarters roof before Valley rescues Sarah moments before midnight. As Valley leaves, he says, "There's nothing the Penguin can throw at me that I haven't encountered before." The Penguin reluctantly agrees with this sentiment, accepting that he has become passé. Subsequently, the Penguin turns his attentions to a new modus operandi, operating behind the front of a legitimate restaurant and casino called the Iceberg Lounge.

In the storyline "No Man's Land", Gotham City is devastated by an earthquake. Penguin stays behind when the U.S. government blockades the city. He becomes one of the major players in the lawless city, using his connections to profit by trading the money that nobody else in Gotham could use for goods through his contacts outside the city. One of these connections is discovered to be Lex Luthor and his company LexCorp. Penguin's information helps Luthor to gain control of Gotham's property records, but Luthor dismisses him when the Penguin attempts to blackmail Luthor.

The Penguin was swept up in the events of Infinite Crisis, where he is briefly seen as part of the Battle of Metropolis, a large-scale battle started by Alexander Luthor Jr.'s Secret Society of Super Villains. The Penguin, along with several other villains, is bowled over at the surprise appearance of Bart Allen.

One Year Later while the Penguin is away from Gotham City, Great White Shark and Tally Man kill many of the villains who had worked for him, and frame the reformed Harvey Dent. The Great White Shark had planned to take over Gotham's criminal syndicate and eliminate the competition, the Penguin included. Upon his return to Gotham, the Penguin continues to claim that he has gone straight, and reopens the Iceberg, selling overpriced Penguin merchandise. He urges the Riddler to avoid crime, as their new shady but legal lifestyle is more lucrative.

The Penguin was featured as a prominent figure in Gotham Underground. He fights a gang war against Tobias Whale, Intergang and the New Rogues, while supposedly running an "underground railroad" for criminals. In the end, Batman convinces the Penguin to become his informant. The Penguin later loses Batman's support after the latter's mysterious disappearance and Intergang's exploitation of the return of the Apokoliptian gods.

The Penguin is eventually attacked by the Secret Six, who kill many of his guards in an ambush at his mansion. Bane informs him that he needs information on Batman's partners, as he plans on killing Red Robin, Batgirl, Catwoman, and Azrael. The Penguin soon betrays the team's location, which results in them being captured. Around this time, the villain Architect bombs and destroys the Iceberg Lounge.

=== The New 52 ===
In Death of the Family, the Penguin puts his right-hand man Ignatius Ogilvy in charge of his operations in his temporary absence. Ogilvy, however, uses the Penguin's absence to declare him dead, taking over his gang and killing those loyal to him. Under the alias "Emperor Penguin", Ogilvy takes over the Penguin's operations. Upon the Joker's defeat, Batman unsuccessfully attempts to imprison the Penguin in Blackgate Penitentiary, only to be forced to release him later. Upon learning of Ogilvy's betrayal, the Penguin attacks his former henchman's new empire, but Batman intervenes and arrests him. The Penguin is found not guilty, however, thanks to the machinations of his ally Mr. Combustible threatening the judge's family. Meanwhile, Ogilvy releases Kirk Langstrom's Man-Bat serum on Gotham City, turning many of the citizens into Man-Bats. Langstrom discovers a cure, returning the citizens to normal.

The Penguin also played a role in Black Canary's rebooted origin. In Birds of Prey (vol. 4) #0, Dinah sought to land a job at the Iceberg Lounge, knowing that a lead on the Basilisk organization which she was pursuing would soon spring up there. Unfortunately, the Penguin was not in the habit of taking job applications, so she decided to prove her worth by infiltrating the outfit by herself. When she arrived in the Penguin's bathroom, he was unimpressed. To prove her worth, she demonstrated her special ability: a sonic scream that could shake down the roof, if it were intense enough. Naturally, the scream alerted the Penguin's henchmen, and she made short work of them with her martial arts skills. Finally impressed, the Penguin hired her, and dubbed her Black Canary in keeping with the ornithological theme.

During the "Forever Evil" storyline, the Penguin is among the villains recruited by the Crime Syndicate of America to join the Secret Society of Super Villains. With the heroes gone, the Penguin becomes the mayor of Gotham City and divides its territories among the inmates of Arkham Asylum.

=== DC Rebirth ===
In the Their Dark Designs arc, the Penguin is one of four Gotham-based villains targeted by Deathstroke, Cheshire, Mr. Teeth, Merlyn, and Gunsmith. After being saved by Batman, he reveals that he and the other targets (the Joker, the Riddler and Catwoman) were once contacted by a supervillain named the Designer in a recruitment into a United Underworld. Batman later learns from Catwoman that Penguin's plan was to win Gotham's mayoral campaign in a legitimate election, with his competition taken out by the hired assassins. Penguin later gathers all of Gotham's supervillains at the Iceberg Lounge in anticipation for "The Joker War".

In the Failsafe arc, the Penguin plans a scheme to rob the Trixie club, with Clayface taking his place. When Batman later tracks him down, he learns that Penguin is apparently dying of a fatal disease, with him apparently committing suicide to end his suffering. Penguin's actions ultimately cause the activation of the robot Failsafe, since the act was framed in a way to make it look like Batman murdered him. However, Catwoman gradually uncovers that Penguin has faked his death to retire to Metropolis, blaming his confrontations with Batman as an addiction. He subsequently leaves his criminal empire to his children Aiden and Addison Cobblepot.

== Characterization ==
=== Skills and abilities ===
The Penguin is a master criminal who aspires to be wealthy, powerful and respected (or at least feared) by Gotham's high society. The Penguin's wealth gives him access to better resources than most other Batman villains, and he is able to mix with Gotham's elite, especially those he plans to target in his future crimes. He is capable of returning to his luxurious lifestyle very easily despite his violent criminal history and prison record. He has attempted multiple times to enter the political world, even launching expensive election campaigns. The Penguin also has strong connections with other criminal kingpins across Gotham, allowing him to hire their assassins and workers to spy on them easily. The Penguin relies on cunning wit and intimidation to exploit his surroundings for profit, and despite his short temper, he is normally depicted as being more rational and sane than other Batman villains, or at least relatively so.

Although he often delegates the dirty work to his henchmen, he is not above taking aggressive and lethal actions on his own, especially when provoked or insulted. In spite of his appearance and stature, he is a dangerous hand-to-hand combatant with enough developed skills in judo, fencing, jujutsu and bare-knuckle boxing to overwhelm attackers many times his size and physical bearing. The Penguin is usually portrayed as a capable physical combatant when he feels the situation calls for it, but his level of skill varies widely depending on the author; the character has been written both as a physical match for Batman and as someone the masked vigilante is capable of defeating with a solid punch. His crimes often revolve around stealing valuable bird-related items and his car and other vehicles often have an avian theme.

=== Equipment ===
The Penguin utilizes an assortment of umbrellas, particularly the Bulgarian umbrella. These usually contain weapons such as machine guns, sword blades, knife blades, rocket launchers, laser blasters, flamethrowers, and acid or poison gas spraying devices fired from the ferrule (however, the Penguin is able to weaponize his umbrellas in an almost unlimited variety of ways). Depending on the writer, some of his umbrellas can carry multiple weapons at once. He often carries an umbrella that can transform its canopy into a series of spinning blades: this can be used as a miniature helicopter or as an offensive weapon; he often uses this to escape a threatening situation. The canopy of the umbrella is sometimes depicted as being a bullet resistant shield, and some are patterned in different ways from a spiral capable of hypnotizing opponents to flashy signs. He can also call upon his flying birds to attack and confuse his enemies in battle.

=== Appearance ===
The Penguin's usual appearance is that of a short, obese human in formal wear. The debut of Tim Burton's version of the character featured in the 1992 film Batman Returns changed the Penguin's traditional guise. In the film, the Penguin's hands are flippers (a physical deformity caused by syndactyly), which, combined with a beak-like nose and other characteristics, made the Penguin look like a cross between an actual penguin and a man. This somewhat bizarre aspect inspired comic book artists and has influenced numerous Penguin designs in cartoons since the film's release, such as Batman: The Animated Series. Currently, both the old and the new appearances of the character alternate in the comics, although there is no clear explanation or basis in reality for this to happen.

=== Relationships ===
The idea of the Penguin and the Joker as a team is one that is decades old, as the two villains, pop-culture wise, are arguably Batman's two most famous enemies. Their first team-up took place fairly early in Batman's career, in "Knights of Knavery". Since then, the two have teamed up countless times throughout the Golden and Silver Ages. This carried over into the 1960s television series as well; both appeared together as a team numerous times. They have even shown affection towards each other on more than one occasion; in one story, "Only Angels Have Wings", the Joker actually cries when it appears that the Penguin has been murdered, and vows to avenge the Penguin's death.

== Reception ==
The character of the Penguin, particularly as portrayed by Burgess Meredith in the 1960s Batman series, has often been used as a theme to mock public figures that supposedly resemble him. Jon Stewart, host of The Daily Show, made numerous references comparing former Vice President Dick Cheney with the Penguin, including a laugh similar to the one Meredith used.

In May 2006, a Republican-led PR firm, DCI Group, created an astroturfing YouTube video satirizing Al Gore's film An Inconvenient Truth. The video portrayed Gore as the Penguin using one of his trick umbrellas to hypnotize a flock of penguins into believing in the existence of global warming and climate change. Roger Stone has also been likened to Penguin due to his manner of dress.

== Other versions ==
Many alternate universe versions of Penguin have appeared throughout the character's publication history.

- In Batman: The Doom That Came to Gotham, Penguin is a wealthy explorer who leads and finances an expedition to Antarctica before being driven insane and abandoning his crew to live with penguins.
- In Joker, Penguin is a notorious underground boxing promoter who secretly handles the Joker's finances.
- In Batman: Earth One, Penguin is the corrupt mayor of Gotham City before he is killed by Alfred Pennyworth and his crimes are publicly exposed.
- In Flashpoint, Penguin is a security professional associated with Wayne Enterprises and an informant for Thomas Wayne.
- In the Absolute Universe, Oswald Cobblepot is a childhood friend of Bruce Wayne who was deformed after being attacked by Bane, leaving him two feet shorter.

== See also ==
- List of Batman family enemies
- Bulgarian umbrella, a real-world weapon similar to the Penguin's umbrella gun which was used by the KGB in several assassinations in the late 1970s
- Syndactyly, the physical deformity which gave some versions of the Penguin his flipper-like hands
