= Allen Raymond =

American political consultant

Allen Raymond is a former Republican political consultant in the United States who spent three months in federal prison for his role in the 2002 New Hampshire Senate election phone jamming scandal, for which he was convicted of making harassing phone calls across state lines, a felony. Raymond is the author of the book, How to Rig an Election: Confessions of a Republican Operative (2008).

== Phone jamming scandal ==
Raymond told investigators that his former Republican National Committee colleague James Tobin approached him with a plan to tie up the phones of New Hampshire Democrats on Election Day 2002, during a close Senate race between Republican John E. Sununu and Democrat Jeanne Shaheen. At the time, Raymond owned a Virginia-based GOP phone-bank company (GOP Marketplace) and also held a paid position as Executive Director of the Republican Leadership Council.

Raymond then collected $15,600 from the New Hampshire Republican State Committee and paid a small Idaho telemarketing company $2,300 to make non-stop hangup phone calls to six New Hampshire phone lines, five of which were being used by the Democratic Party to get out the vote. The sixth phone line belonged to the Manchester Firefighters' Union, which offers free rides to the polls.

In an interview with the Boston Globe, Raymond said he took part in the phone-jamming because he "had been reluctant to turn down a prominent official of the RNC, fearing that would cost him future opportunities from an organization that was becoming increasingly ruthless."

== How to Rig an Election ==
The closing paragraph of his book How to Rig an Election: Confessions of a Republican Operative ends with a line that reflects on a conversation with his wife just before he entered jail; "After ten full years inside the GOP, ninety days amongst honest criminals wasn't any great ordeal."

== Media appearances ==
- Appeared on Real Time with Bill Maher on October 24, 2008, talking about his book
- Appeared on The Daily Show January 17, 2008
- Appeared on The Rachel Maddow Show on January 27, 2009

== Books ==
- How to Rig an Election: Confessions of a Republican Operative (ISBN 1-4165-5222-7).
