= Brian McCabe =

Brian McCabe may refer to:

- Brian McCabe (political consultant), American political strategist
- Brian McCabe (author), Scottish writer
- Bryan McCabe, Canadian ice hockey player
