= The Committee for Truth in Politics =

The Committee for Truth in Politics first began running ads during the 2008 United States presidential election. In 2010, the group ran aads opposing financial reforms and targeting Democrats.

== History ==
The conservative group has received substantial media coverage for its advertising campaigns. The organization was founded in North Carolina, and has filed a suit to protect it from an FEC investigation and enforcement action for running a political ad. The organization has sponsored advertisements against Barack Obama.

== See also ==
- RightChange.com
- American Issues Project
