= Corry Bliss =

American political consultant and campaign manager

Corwin Albert "Corry" Bliss (born 1981) is an American political consultant and campaign manager to Republican Party (GOP) campaigns. In December 2016, he was named Executive Director of the American Action Network and Congressional Leadership Fund, one of the leading independent political organizations and SuperPACs in the U.S. On his appointment, The New York Times referred to Bliss as "one of his party's most closely watched young strategists."

== Career ==
Bliss was raised on a horse farm in Westchester County, New York (where he became an accomplished handicapper). He received his undergraduate degree from Boston University and his J.D. from the CUNY School of Law. In 2010, Bliss was helming the campaign of Lt. Gov. Brian Dubie for Governor of Vermont in 2010—a Republican year, but in a state that had become solidly Democratic at most levels. Dubie lost, 47.7% to 49.5%, to Peter Shumlin, who was later selected by the Legislature (under the state Constitution's provision when no candidate receives an absolute majority).

In 2012, Bliss was named manager for Linda McMahon's second campaign for U.S. Senate in Connecticut, as the businesswoman and WWF executive completely overhauled her political team from her previous bid two years earlier. Bliss worked with national strategist Chris LaCivita to give McMahon a more aggressive operation, and they helped McMahon to victory in a GOP primary contested by former longtime Congressman Christopher Shays. The fall race tightened—from August thru mid-October, most statewide polls showed the race even or within the margin of error. but the state's increasing liberalism and the presidential-year downdraft from Mitt Romney's loss to Barack Obama proved too much, and though she ran 7 percentage points ahead of Romney, she was defeated, 43.3% to 55.1% for Congressman Chris Murphy.

Georgia Secretary of State Karen Handel hired Bliss in 2013 to manage her campaign in the hotly contested primary for the U.S. Senate seat being vacated by retiring Sen. Saxby Chambliss. Handel, financially outgunned by wealthy businessman David Perdue and House Appropriations Chair Jack Kingston, nevertheless ran a strong third in the May 2014 primary. She polled 22% to Kingston's 25.8% and Perdue's 30.6%.

In September 2014, Senate Republicans tapped Bliss and his ally LaCivita to rescue the faltering campaign of incumbent Pat Roberts in Kansas, facing a serious challenge from Independent candidate Greg Orman (following the withdrawal of the Democratic nominee, in what was heretofore a three-way general-election contest). Bliss took over day-to-day command of the Kansan's campaign for the final two months. Roberts, behind or even with Orman in nearly all opinion polls that fall, won re-election with a surprisingly strong 53.1% to Orman's 42.5%.

Bliss's next challenge was the 2016 campaign to re-elect Rob Portman to the U.S. Senate from heavily targeted Ohio, in a presidential year when Democratic turnout was expected to peak, and both parties would bombard Buckeye State voters with tens of millions of dollars in TV, cable and digital ads. Bliss chose to run what Time magazine called "a hyperlocal campaign without betting on the nominee's coattails."

As Real Clear Politics noted, Portman and Bliss had "the thorny challenge of keeping distance from Trump in a state Trump [was] poised to win. Portman, in the year of the outsider, [was] even more of an insider than Clinton . . . Yet he [ran] a local campaign focused on issues like human trafficking and opioid addiction, and secured the endorsement of the Teamsters as well as other unions" (despite being a mostly conservative Republican).

Polls showed the race even (or Portman slightly behind) as of June 2016; afterwards, Portman led Democratic ex-Gov. Ted Strickland in every public survey through Election Day. The final result was 58.0% to 37.2%, nearly a 21-point margin for Portman.

Chris Cillizza of The Washington Post argued that the context of Ohio's result had wider implications. "There are a lot of reasons Republicans held the Senate this fall. But Portman's candidacy in Ohio is the most important one. Portman took a seemingly competitive race in a swing state and put it out of reach by Labor Day, allowing money that was ticketed for his state to be in other races, such as North Carolina and Missouri . . ."

The Washington Post said "Portman took the crown for best campaign", while Real Clear Politics said, "Sen. Rob Portman ran the campaign of the year.". Time magazine called Bliss the "National Republicans’ favorite political fixer"

Portman himself said, ""With an emphasis on utilizing data, grassroots, and technology, Corry led our campaign from behind in the polls to a 21-point victory. He's one of the best strategists in the country."

In naming Bliss to head American Action Network, Chairman Norm Coleman said, "Corry is one of the best young operatives in the country and just managed one of the best campaigns of the 2016 cycle . . .I look forward to working with him to build on our success, and I know we will continue to impact our nation's policies and leaders under his watch." AAN/CLF "promotes limited government policies with the goal of helping House Republicans retain their majority in 2018." Together, AAN and CLF spent $48 million across more than 30 House races in 2016, losing only three of them.

== Personal life ==
Bliss, his wife (the former Kim Fanok) and their son live in Northern Virginia.
