= List of programs broadcast by IFC =

IFC is an American basic cable television channel owned by AMC Networks.

== Original programming ==
=== Comedy ===
Title	Genre	Premiere	Seasons	Length	Status
The Festival	Comedy	August 19, 2005	1 seasons, 6 episodes	23 min	Ended
The Business	Comedy	August 4, 2006	2 seasons, 16 episodes	21–25 min	Ended
The Minor Accomplishments of Jackie Woodman	Comedy	August 4, 2006	2 seasons, 16 episodes	26–28 min	Ended
Z Rock	Comedy	August 24, 2008	2 seasons, 20 episodes	24–27 min	Ended
Food Party	Cooking show/Parody	June 9, 2009	2 seasons, 20 episodes	9–16 min	Ended
The Kids in the Hall: Death Comes to Town	Comedy	August 20, 2010	8 episodes	22–26 min	Miniseries
The Increasingly Poor Decisions of Todd Margaret	Comedy	October 1, 2010	3 seasons, 18 episodes	22–23 min	Ended
Onion News Network	News satire	January 21, 2011	2 seasons, 20 episodes	22–23 min	Ended
Portlandia	Sketch comedy	January 21, 2011	8 seasons, 77 episodes	21–23 min	Ended
Comedy Bang! Bang!	Sketch comedy	June 8, 2012	5 seasons, 110 episodes	22–23 min	Ended
Bullet in the Face	Dark comedy	August 16, 2012	1 season, 6 episodes	23–24 min	Ended
The Birthday Boys	Sketch comedy	October 18, 2013	2 seasons, 20 episodes	22–23 min	Ended
Maron	Comedy	May 13, 2013	4 seasons, 49 episodes	21–23 min	Ended
Bollywood Hero	Comedy	January 9, 2014	3 episodes	60 min	Miniseries
The Spoils of Babylon	Parody	January 9, 2014	6 episodes	22–23 min	Miniseries
Garfunkel and Oates	Comedy	August 7, 2014	1 season, 8 episodes	21–23 min	Ended
The Spoils Before Dying	Parody	July 8, 2015	6 episodes	22–23 min	Miniseries
Documentary Now!	Anthology/Parody	August 20, 2015	4 seasons, 26 episodes	20–24 min	Ended
Benders	Comedy	October 1, 2015	1 season, 8 episodes	20–21 min	Ended
Gigi Does It	Comedy	October 1, 2015	1 season, 8 episodes	22 min	Ended
Stan Against Evil	Comedy horror	October 31, 2016	3 season, 24 episodes	21–22 min	Ended
Brockmire	Comedy	April 5, 2017	4 seasons, 32 episodes	21–23 min	Ended
Sherman's Showcase	Comedy	July 31, 2019	2 seasons, 15 episodes	21–45 min	Ended

==== Adult animation ====
Title	Genre	Premiere	Seasons	Length	Status
Hopeless Pictures	Comedy	August 19, 2005	1 season, 9 episodes	16–27 min	Ended
Out There	Comedy	February 22, 2013	1 season, 10 episodes	23 min	Ended

=== Unscripted ===
==== Docuseries ====
Title	Genre	Premiere	Seasons	Length	Status
Henry Rollins: Uncut	Travel	December 14, 2007	1 season, 3 episodes	53–59 min	Ended
The IFC Media Project	Documentary	November 18, 2008	3 season, 15 episodes	22–28 min	Ended
Monty Python: Almost the Truth (Lawyers Cut)	Documentary	October 18, 2009	6 episodes	50–57 min	Miniseries
Young, Broke & Beautiful	Travel	June 24, 2011	1 seasons, 6 episodes	23 min	Ended

==== Reality ====
Title	Genre	Premiere	Seasons	Length	Status
Dinner with the Band	Cooking show	November 24, 2009	2 seasons, 16 episodes	21–25 min	Ended
Rhett and Link: Commercial Kings	Reality	June 24, 2011	1 seasons, 10 episodes	23 min	Ended
Bunk	Game show	June 8, 2012	1 season, 10 episodes	22–23 min	Ended
In the Kitchen with Harry Hamlin	Cooking show	May 15, 2024	2 seasons, 10 episodes	20–22 min	Ended

==== Variety ====
Title	Genre	Premiere	Seasons	Length	Status
Split Screen	Talk show	March 10, 1997	4 seasons, 66 episodes	22 min	Ended
Fishing with John	Fishing television series	June 15, 1998	1 season, 6 episodes	22 min	Ended
Dinner for Five	Talk show	July 6, 2001	5 seasons, 50 episodes	22–44 min	Ended
The Henry Rollins Show	Talk show	April 1, 2006	2 seasons, 41 episodes	11–28 min	Ended
Framed	Talk show	April 1, 2006	1 season, 5 episodes	60 min	Ended
Cue the Laughs	Comedy clip show	November 7, 2026	1 season, 6 episodes	22 min	Season 1 ongoing

=== Co-productions ===
Title	Genre	Partner/Country	Premiere	Seasons	Length	Status
Dead Set	Horror comedy drama	Channel 4/United Kingdom	October 25, 2010	5 episodes	23–45 min	Miniseries
Year of the Rabbit	Sitcom	Channel 4/United Kingdom	February 19, 2020	1 season, 6 episodes	23–25 min	Ended
Hullraisers (season 1)	Sitcom	Channel 4/United Kingdom	April 5, 2023	1 season, 6 episodes	23–24 min	Ended (Note: The series was renewed for a second series by Channel 4, but did not air on IFC.)
SisterS	Comedy drama	Crave/Canada; RTÉ One/Ireland	May 17, 2023	2 seasons, 12 episodes	22–25 min	Pending

=== Continuations ===
Title	Genre	Prev. network(s)	Premiere	Seasons	Length	Status
Greg the Bunny (seasons 2–3)	Comedy	Fox	August 19, 2005	2 season, 20 episodes	8–13 min	Ended
The Whitest Kids U' Know (seasons 2–5)	Sketch comedy	Fuse	February 10, 2008	4 seasons, 50 episodes	10–24 min	Ended
Cooper's Bar (season 2)	Comedy	AMC.com	October 11, 2023	1 season, 6 episodes	20–22 min	Ended

=== Specials ===
Title	Genre	Premiere	Length
In the Kitchen with Harry Hamlin: A Holiday Special	Cooking show	December 13, 2023	22 min

=== Web series ===
- Cutting Ties
- Dead & Lonely
- Four Eyed Monsters
- Funnel of Darkness
- Get Hit
- Getting Away with Murder
- Good Morning Internet!
- Lunchbox
- Like So Many Things
- The Mary Van Note Show
- Pushing Twilight
- The Stagg Party
- The Unclothed Man in the 35th Century A.D.
- Trapped in the Closet
- Wilfred
- Young American Bodies

== Acquired programming ==
=== Current ===
- The Three Stooges (2013)
- Two and a Half Men (2018)
- Three's Company (2020)
- Everybody Loves Raymond (2021)
- Who's the Boss? (2023)
- Sanford and Son (2024)
- Night Court (2024)
- Coach (2024)
- Tales from the Crypt (2026)

=== Former ===
- Basilisk (2006–07)
- Samurai 7 (2006)
- Gunslinger Girl (2007)
- The Jon Dore Television Show (2007–10)
- Hell Girl (2008)
- The IT Crowd (2008–12)
- Witchblade (2008)
- Arrested Development (2009–14)
- Monty Python's Flying Circus (2009)
- Dead Set (2010)
- Freaks and Geeks (2010–12)
- The Kids in the Hall (2010–12; 2021–22)
- Undeclared (2010–12)
- Wilfred (2010)
- The Ben Stiller Show (2011–12)
- The Larry Sanders Show (2011–12)
- Malcolm in the Middle (2011–14)
- Happy Tree Friends (2011–14)
- Mr. Show with Bob and David (2011–12)
- Action (2012–13)
- Dilbert (2012–13)
- Toast of London (2013–15)
- The Monkees (2015–16)
- Orphan Black (2015)
- That '70s Show (2015–20)
- Baroness von Sketch Show (2017–21)
- Blue Planet II (2018)
- Fleabag (2018–19)
- Pee-wee's Playhouse (2018–20)
- Batman (2019)
- Dynasties (2019)
- Community (2020–21)
- Mystery Science Theater 3000 (2020–21)
- Parks and Recreation (2020–24)
- Saved by the Bell (2020–22)
- Saved by the Bell: The College Years (2020–22)
- Seven Worlds, One Planet (2020–21)
- 3rd Rock from the Sun (2021–24)
- Back (2021)
- Good Grief (2021–22)
- Kevin Can F**k Himself (2021)
- The Ropers (2021)
- Scrubs (2021–23)
- Slo Pitch (2021–22)
- Three's a Crowd (2021)
- Gilligan's Island (2022–23)
- Hogan's Heroes (2022)
- Monk (2023)
- The Lovers (2024)
- The A-Team (2025)
