= Preserve America PAC =

Super PAC supporting Donald Trump

- Legal status: Super PAC
- Leader: Lisa Lisker (treasurer)
- Website: https://preserveamericapac.com/

Preserve America PAC is a single-candidate Super PAC that supported Donald Trump in the 2024 United States presidential election. Primarily funded by Sheldon and Miriam Adelson in 2020, and by Miriam Adelson after her husband's death, the Super PAC spent over $100 million in each of the 2020 and 2024 elections.

== Description ==
The New York Times described Chris LaCivita as the person in charge of the SuperPAC in June 2024. The treasurer is Lisa Lisker, while Republican strategist Dave Carney was described as the leader senior advisor, or the person "who will run the group".

The Preserve America PAC received donations of $25 million from Miriam Adelson in July, August, and September 2024, and another donation of $20 million from Adelson also in September 2024.

== Activities ==
In the 2020 presidential election Preserve America PAC spent $100 million in support of Trump against Joe Biden. The Super PAC was supported by Miriam Adelson and her husband Sheldon, who donated $90 million to the group. In the 2024 election, the organization was revived by Miriam Adelson after her husband's death. In August 2024 Trump aide Natalie Harp contacted Adelson, reportedly on behalf of Trump, to complain that the organization was being run by "RINOs".

Preserve America PAC began running advertisements attacking Democratic presidential candidate Kamala Harris during the 2024 Summer Olympics. These advertisements were run primarily in the Michigan, Pennsylvania, and Wisconsin, three swing states. According to the National Review, the group produced "many brutal ads" attacking Harris during the following months.

On August 21, the group released an advertisement which focused on the 2010 murder of Joshua Wilkerson. Although Wilkerson was murdered in Texas, and Harris was Attorney General of California at the time, the Washington Post concluded that viewers who didn't pay careful attention to the date on Wilkerson's tomb could "easily" draw the conclusion that the murder was tied to the Biden administration's border policies.

On September 12, the group released an advertisement featuring Scott Creighton, a retired Minneapolis police officer who attacked Harris over her actions during the George Floyd protests in Minneapolis. Creighton, who was injured in the protests, was a witness for the defense in Derek Chauvin's trial for the murder of George Floyd. An analysis of the advertisement by The Washington Post found it misleading and rated it at "three Pinocchios" according to the rating scale of the Washington Post fact checker.

The Super PAC produced a 60-second advertisement attacking Harris on immigration to be run in Michigan and Wisconsin in the closing days of the 2024 presidential campaign.
