= Brian McCabe (political consultant) =

American political consultant

- Education: University of New Hampshire, B.A./B.S., 1991
- Occupation: political consultant
- Years active: 1991 to present
- Political party: Republican party (United States)

Brian McCabe is a conservative political strategist who assisted with the 1996 presidential campaign of Bob Dole and the 2004 reelection campaign of George W. Bush. A partner in the Republican political consulting firm DCI Group, and the president of Progress for America (PFA), McCabe splits his time between Washington, D.C., and New Hampshire, where he also heads a news-clipping service called CustomScoop.

== Early career ==
McCabe graduated from the University of New Hampshire in 1991 with a B.A. in economics and a B.S. in business administration from the Whittemore School of Business and Economics. He was the university's Student Body President in his senior year, delivering a speech at the university's commencement ceremony after keynote speaker Lamar Alexander, who was then United States Secretary of Education. McCabe started his career in politics working for former U.S. Congressman Bill Zeliff (R-NH), managing Zeliff's congressional campaigns in 1994 and 1996.

During the 1996 New Hampshire Republican primary, McCabe was the executive director of the campaign of Bob Dole. McCabe also founded the McCabe Consulting Group in 1996. McCabe was also an early partner at DCI Group, "a full-service public and government affairs firm based in Washington, D.C."

== 2004 Presidential campaign activity ==
In the spring of 2004, Chris LaCivita, who preceded McCabe as president of Progress for America, left DCI to work on two Republican Senate campaigns. McCabe then succeeded him as president of PFA, PFA and DCI having close ties, as PFA's fund-raising and ad buying is run by employees of DCI Group. and was very active during the 2004 Presidential Election. Many Republicans were, at the time, criticizing Democrats for exploiting a loophole in campaign finance law using so-called 527 groups. The Bipartisan Campaign Reform Act, passed by Congress in 2002, was intended to limit the influence of corporations, labor unions and wealthy individuals by putting strict limits on their contributions to any candidate, political party, or PAC.

For example, in 2004 the maximum individual donation to a US presidential candidate was $2,000. Such limits do not apply, however, to a "527" group like MoveOn.org that maintains independence from regulated committees and does not expressly advocate the election or defeat of a particular candidate. McCabe, as President of the Progress for America Voters' Fund, was a primary public spokesperson for the Republican shift from decrying liberals' use of 527s and starting their own. "We felt it was imperative that we engage in the debate and help level the playing field to counter what the liberal 527s have done over the past year, beating up President Bush", he told reporters in August 2004.

In May 2004, the Federal Election Commission announced that it would not rule on the legality of the 527 groups until after the 2004 Presidential election. In October, McCabe said that his creation of PFA's 527 was in direct response to that decision by the FEC. By October, 2004, McCabe and the PFA Voters' Fund had raised $32 million, including $5 million each from just two people: Dawn Arnall, the wife of Ameriquest Corp. chairman Roland Arnall, and Alex Spanos, who owns the San Diego Chargers. The PFA Voters' Fund spent more than $20 million on television ad campaigns, including one called "Ashley's Story" which featured a 15-year-old Ohio girl who had lost her mother in the September 11 attacks hugging President Bush and saying, "All he wants to do is make sure I'm safe". The ad was considered one of the most successful of the campaign.

== Later activities ==
In 2005, McCabe noted that "half of his group's $18 million war chest remains unspent", and that PFA would use those funds "during the next nomination process". McCabe also used these resources to support George W. Bush Supreme Court candidates. Interviewed by Newsweek, he praised Bush's selection of Samuel Alito to succeed Sandra Day O'Connor on the Supreme Court of the United States, contending that Alito's record would overcome elements of the campaign against his confirmation. Under McCabe's leadership, PFA acted quickly setting up websites and engaging in lobbying for the confirmation of both Alito and John Roberts.

McCabe is also "one of the founding partners and CEO of CustomScoop, an electronic news clipping service specializing in corporate public policy news tracking". He is also on the Brooks School Board of Trustees, and the University of New Hampshire Foundation Board.
