= Tony Feather =

American political consultant

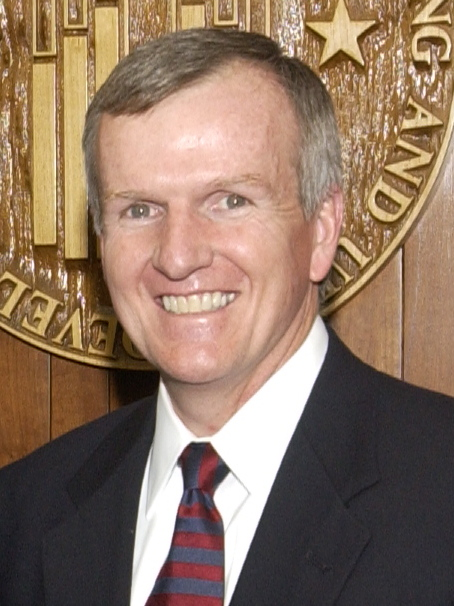
Feather in 2003

Tony Feather is a Missouri-based American political consultant for the Republican National Committee and Republican candidates and campaign who specializes in direct voter contact. Feather is a co-founder, with fellow Republican Jeff Larson of FLSConnect, the leading Republican direct voter contact company in America.

Feather has run campaigns for former U.S. Attorney General John Ashcroft, and former Missouri attorney general, Bill Webster.

Feather is a specialist in "microtargeting" voters by phone and other means of "direct voter contact" for Republican campaigns and issue-oriented clients.

Feather is a co-founder of the Republican 527 group Progress for America, a group that spent millions supporting Bush in 2004, and (with Chris LaCivita) of the American Issues Project (AIP), which has been airing ads in the 2008 presidential election raising questions about ties between Barack Obama and William Ayers. The American Issues Project is organized as a 501(c)(4) nonprofit, so that it can engage in limited amounts of civic campaigning, but cannot legally advocate for or against candidates.

Feather, from Sarcoxie, Mo., attended Missouri Southern State University in Joplin and was sports editor of the student newspaper The Chart in the early 1970s.

== See also ==
- Opposition research
- American Issues Project
