= Douglas Holtz-Eakin =

American economist (born 1958)

Doug Holtz-Eakin
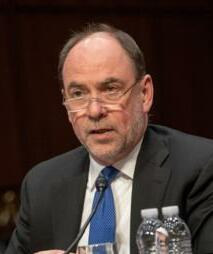

6th Director of the Congressional Budget Office
- In office February 5, 2003 – December 29, 2005
- Preceded by: Dan Crippen
- Succeeded by: Peter R. Orszag

Personal details
- Born: Douglas James Eakin; February 3, 1958 (age 67); Pittsburgh, Pennsylvania, U.S.
- Political party: Republican
- Spouse(s): Heidi Holtz (Divorced); Adrienne Eich-Mylott (Divorced); Beth Robinson
- Children: 2 (with Heidi Holtz)
- Education: Denison University (BA); Princeton University (MA, PhD)

Douglas James Holtz-Eakin (born February 3, 1958) is an American economist. He was formerly an economics professor at Syracuse University, director of the Congressional Budget Office, and chief economic policy adviser to Senator John McCain's 2008 presidential campaign. Holtz-Eakin is currently president of the American Action Forum, a conservative advocacy group.

== Early life ==
Eakin was born and raised in suburban Pittsburgh, Pennsylvania, in 1958, where his Navy-veteran father worked as a steel plant manager. He received a B.A. in economics and mathematics from Denison University in 1980 and a Ph.D. in economics from Princeton University in 1985. He took his first wife's maiden name, Holtz, as part of his own upon their marriage in 1981.

== Career ==
Holtz-Eakin established his academic career with appointments at Princeton (1984–89) and Columbia University (1985–90).

From August 1989 to July 1990, Holtz-Eakin served as a Senior Staff Economist on President George H. W. Bush's Council of Economic Advisers. From 1986 to 2001 he also served as a Faculty Research Fellow and research associate at the National Bureau of Economic Research. Holtz-Eakin was tenured faculty at the Maxwell School of Citizenship and Public Affairs at Syracuse University from 1990 to 2003, where he was appointed professor in 1995 and chair of the department of economics from 1997 to 2001.

In 2003, Holtz-Eakin left Syracuse University to become director of the Congressional Budget Office. Under his leadership, the budget office undertook a study of tax rates, which found that any new revenue that tax cuts brought in paled in comparison with their cost. He left the appointment in 2005.

Holtz-Eakin is also the President of DHE Consulting, LLC, and has served as director of the Maurice R. Greenberg Center for Geoeconomic Studies and the Paul A. Volcker Chair in International Economics at the Council on Foreign Relations, as well as a senior visiting fellow at the Peterson Institute for International Economics from 2007 to 2008. In 2009, he joined the Manhattan Institute's Center for Medical Progress as a fellow focusing on health care reform issues, but left later that year to found his own think tank.

Senate Minority Leader Mitch McConnell appointed Holtz-Eakin to the Financial Crisis Inquiry Commission in 2009.

=== Economic adviser to John McCain ===
In 2007, Holtz-Eakin was hired as chief economic policy adviser to U.S. Senator John McCain's 2008 presidential campaign. Through the campaign and coincident 2008 financial crisis, he remained in the media spotlight on the candidate's proposals for the economy and health care. Holtz-Eakin drew particular attention when he claimed that, as a U.S. Senator on the Commerce Committee, McCain "helped create" the BlackBerry wireless device.

=== President of American Action Forum ===
In early 2010, Holtz-Eakin became president of American Action Forum, a conservative think tank focused on fiscal and public policy issues. Since joining American Action Forum, Holtz-Eakin has appeared on Fox News to argue against a 2010 health care bill, as well as writing a similarly worded Op-Ed for The New York Times. Holtz-Eakin has been active in supporting Senate immigration bill S.744, which would increase annual legal immigration numbers, legalize illegal immigrants in the United States and some who have already been deported, and promises future enforcement efforts to deter future illegal immigration.

== Personal life ==
Holtz-Eakin currently lives in Washington, D.C., is married to Beth Robinson, and has two children.

In 2013, Holtz-Eakin was a signatory to an amicus curiae brief submitted to the Supreme Court in support of same-sex marriage during the Hollingsworth v. Perry case.
