= Karin Riis-Jørgensen =

Danish politician

Karin Riis-Jørgensen MEP
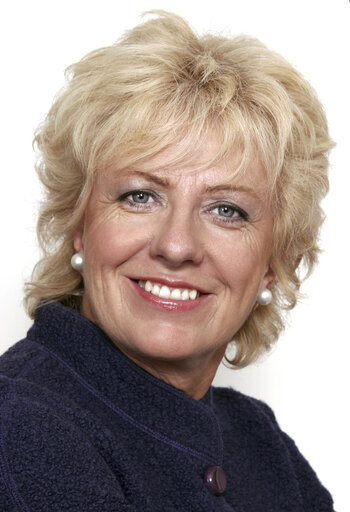

Member of the European Parliament for Denmark
- In office 19 July 1994 – 13 July 2009

Personal details
- Born: 11 July 1952 Odense, Denmark
- Party: Venstre

Karin Riis-Jørgensen (born 7 November 1952, in Odense) is a Danish politician who was a Member of the European Parliament for Venstre between 1994 and 2009. She was a vice-chairwoman of the Alliance of Liberals and Democrats for Europe and sat on the European Parliament's Committee on Economic and Monetary Affairs. She is the Chairwoman of the European Privacy Association, co-founded with Pat Cox in 2009.

In the European Parliament she was also a substitute for the Committee on the Internal Market and Consumer Protection, a member of the Delegation for relations with the People's Republic of China and a substitute for the Delegation for relations with the United States.

== Education ==
- 1978: Degree in law

== Career ==
- 1979–1989: Lawyer with the Danish Federation of Small and Medium-sized Enterprises (Copenhagen and Brussels
- 1989–1994: Head of department at Coopers & Lybrand
- since 1994: part-time employment with Price Waterhouse Coopers
- since 1994: Member of the Executive of Venstre, Denmark's Liberal Party
- since 2002: Member of the bureau of Venstre's parliamentary group in the Folketing
- 1994–2009: Member of the European Parliament
- 2002–2009: Vice-chairwoman of the Group of the European Liberal, Democrat and Reform Party (ELDR)

== See also ==
- 2004 European Parliament election in Denmark
