= Al Gore's Penguin Army =

2006 parody webvideo

- YouTube thumbnail
- Production company: "toutsmith" (YouTube channel)
- Distributed by: YouTube (link)
- Release date: May 24, 2006
- Running time: 2 minutes, 4 seconds
- Country: United States
- Language: English

Al Gore's Penguin Army is a two-minute-long satirical webvideo posted on YouTube on May 24, 2006, spoofing Al Gore and his movie An Inconvenient Truth. There is evidence that the video is a product of the dishonest marketing technique of astroturfing. Despite all appearances of being an amateur production, The Wall Street Journal discovered that the author of the video was using "a computer registered to DCI Group", a public relations and lobbying firm led exclusively by Republican party officials. At the time the video was made, DCI's clients included General Motors and ExxonMobil. DCI has refused to comment on its involvement with the video.

== Synopsis ==
The webvideo starts by mimicking a commercial film, produced by the fictional Hollywood Movie Report and quotes the real Newsweek article "Gore Redux" by Eleanor Clift as a critic's recommendation. A black margin surrounds the viewing screen, artificially making the video appear as though it was created with archaic technology.

An umbrella-wielding and clothed penguin, modeled after the Batman supervillain The Penguin, with the face of Al Gore leads a group of smaller penguins, modeled after the computer operating system Linux's mascot Tux, into an ice cave. Gore shows the penguins a slideshow presentation entitled "Overview of Global Warming" like a teacher or professor. At the start of the lecture, the penguins quickly become alarmed by the threat of global warming. Gore presents a sequence of scientific graphs while ironically stating "It's all very simple", repeatedly voicing "quack, quack" incoherently. The penguins all fall asleep from boredom. Continuing the presentation, Gore asserts that global warming is the cause of seemingly nonsensical happenings so that the video satirizes the real Gore's claims about global warming: turmoil in the Middle East, celebrity news, meteorological events that suggest that the Earth is not in fact warming, and upsets in sports.

After ending the lecture, Gore twirls his umbrella to hypnotize three penguins, as The Penguin can do in the Batman media franchise. He leads them forth to the "Red State Theater", implied to be in Montana. Large crowds of people and penguins are going to watch X-Men: The Last Stand. Only those three penguins, however, go to watch An Inconvenient Truth; likewise, they all fall asleep from boredom. Back in the ice cave and lecture hall, Gore orders a number of penguins to "take action to stop Global Warming!", oblivious to their all sleeping.

The video then shifts to a text-based scene "Things you can do to Stop Global Warming", suggesting viewers to "stop exhaling" and "walk everywhere no matter the distance", among other absurdities. In the last scene, a lone penguin is walking in the cave when a shark rises and returns to the water, taking along the penguin to eat. Finally, the video presents the text "The End" on a black screen. Al Gore abruptly appears on the screen and sounds some evil laughter; he twirls his umbrella at the direction of the real-life viewers to hypnotize them, breaking the fourth wall. The viewer is left warned that Al Gore is attempting to trick him into believing absurdities.

== Authorship ==
The video, which has a "home-made, humorous quality", was posted on YouTube by "Toutsmith," a person who identified himself as a 29-year-old from Beverly Hills. The video was released on May 24, 2006, the same date as the release of An Inconvenient Truth. The Wall Street Journal journalist Antonio Regalado noticed that, despite the amateur production values, a link to the video was the first sponsored listing when he performed a Google search for Al Gore, suggesting to him that someone was paying money to advertise this 'amateur' video. Regalado examined routing information on an e-mail sent by Toutsmith to Regalado and found that the e-mail had been sent from a computer associated with the DCI Group, in Washington, D.C.

When asked if they created the video, DCI Group responded "We do not disclose the names of our clients, nor do we discuss the work we do on behalf of our clients." The Wall Street Journal also found that sponsored links to the Al Gore video had been placed on Google, and were taken down after DCI was contacted by the Journal. The identity of the party who paid for the sponsored links remains unknown as of 2006.

== Opinions ==
The Wall Street Journal consulted a professor of communications who described the spoof as "'Propaganda 101' and said: "It contains no factual information, but presents a highly negative image [of Al Gore]."

== See also ==
- ManBearPig, a South Park episode lampooning Gore
