= Jeff Larson =

American political consultant

Jeff Larson is an American political consultant and entrepreneur who was CEO of the Minneapolis St. Paul 2008 Host Committee, which organized the 2008 Republican National Convention. He worked on Reince Priebus's successful campaign to become RNC Chairman and in 2011 became RNC Chief of Staff. In March 2013, he became Senior Advisor to Priebus and the Chief of Staff position went to Mike Shields.

== Career ==
In 1999, Larson co-founded and became a partner, with fellow Republicans Tony Feather and Tom Synhorst, in a consortium of media consultancy companies, Feather Larson & Synhorst - DCI. The company was actively involved in supporting George W. Bush in the 2000 presidential primaries and received $21.3 million from the Bush-Cheney campaign in 2004. Larson specializes in tele-fundraising and voter contact programs. According to the New York Times, Larson's firm has been tied to the onslaught of negative robocalls about Senator Barack Obama on behalf of Senator John McCain. Larson told the Minneapolis Star Tribune, however, that FLS Connect is not involved in nationwide robo-calls attacking Obama, although his firm has been hired to make live calls in Minnesota on behalf of McCain.

During the 2020 COVID-19 pandemic, FLS Connect received between $1 million and $2 million in federally backed small business loans from The Central Trust Bank as part of the Paycheck Protection Program.
