= Henry Rollins: Uncut =

- Genre: Documentary
- Directed by: Rhett Bachner; Kevin Morra; Paul J. Morra
- No. of seasons: 1
- No. of episodes: 3

Production
- Running time: 60 minutes
- Production company: Swift River Productions

Original release
- Network: IFC
- Release: November 7 – November 21, 2008

Henry Rollins: Uncut is an American television documentary series that premiered on November 7, 2008, on IFC.

The special event series follows musician, author, and spoken-word artist Henry Rollins as he travels to controversial locals including New Orleans, Israel, and South Africa. At each location he shares his outspoken commentary on politics, culture, and media.

The series is filmed at various locations and is produced by Swift River Productions.

== Episodes ==
No.	Title	Original release date	Prod. code
1	"Henry Rollins Uncut: New Orleans"	November 7, 2008	101
Rollins visits New Orleans three years after Hurricane Katrina. By delving into the areas not frequented by tourists, Henry uncovers the continuation of devastating problems for the residents, as well as their struggle to pick up the pieces of their lives in the face of a surge of violent crime. Featured interviews with city officials as well as Irma Thomas, the so-called "Soul Queen of New Orleons."
2	"Henry Rollins Uncut: South Africa"	November 14, 2008	102
Rollins visits the a newly liberated South Africa, only to discover a citizenry plagued with unemployment, hunger, and the everyday threat of the AIDS pandemic. He tours important locations including the jail cell that held Nelson Mandela. Narrated by Archbishop Desmond Tutu.
3	"Henry Rollins Uncut: Northern Ireland"	November 21, 2008	103
Rollins travels to Northern Ireland to explore the bloody past of an area that suffered through sectarian violence for over thirty years. Interviews with individuals who played important roles in Northern Ireland during those troubled years share their thoughts on what America can do about the similar Iraqi occupation. Featured interviews include Peter Robinson, the then First Minister of Northern Ireland, and civil rights activist Eamonn McCann.
