= American Action Network =

American nonprofit organization

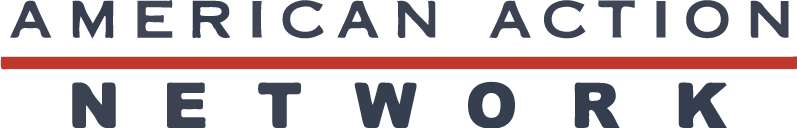

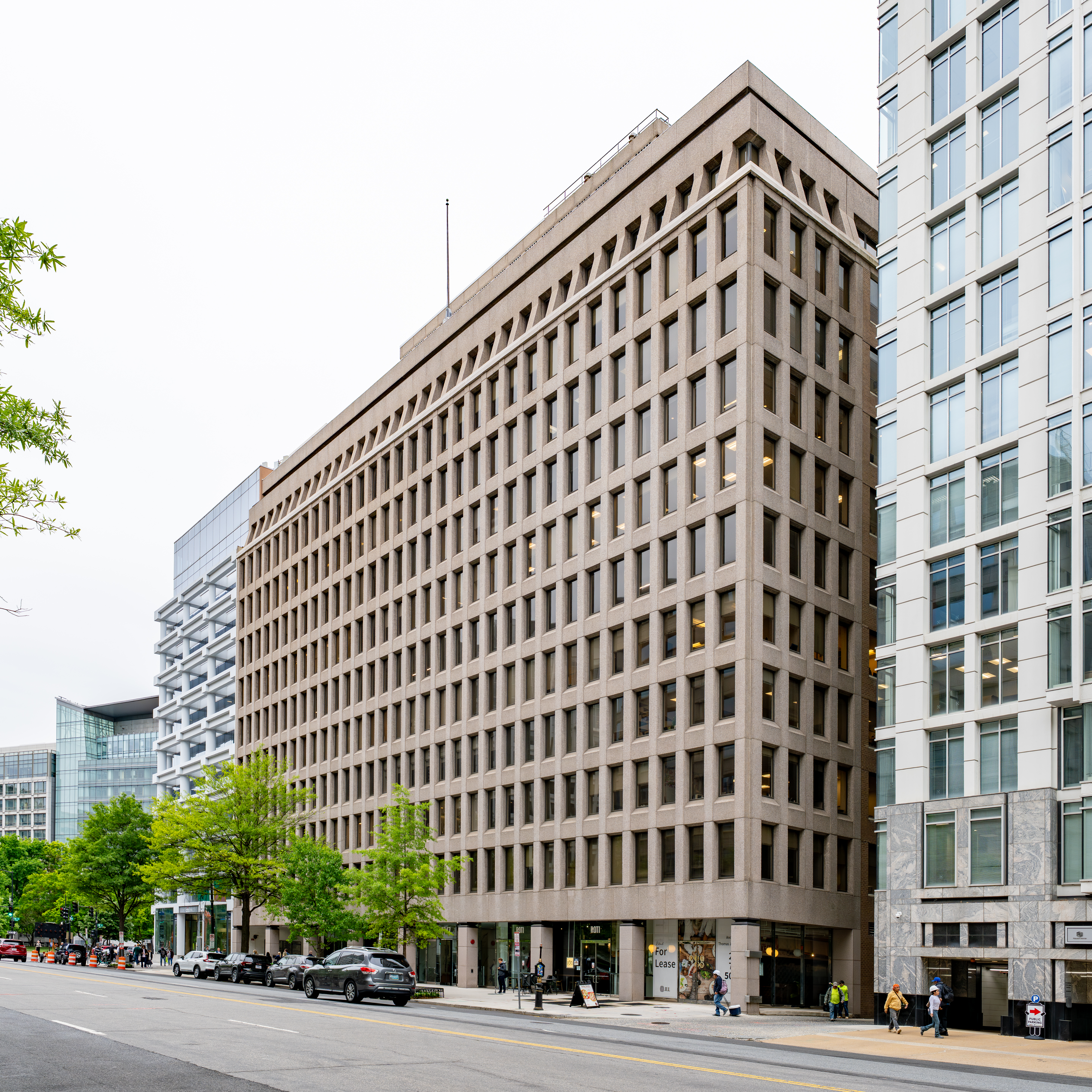
- Headquarters in Washington, D.C.
- Abbreviation: AAN
- Founded: July 23, 2009
- Founder: Fred Malek
- Type: Issue advocacy
- Tax ID no.: 27-0730508
- Legal status: 501(c)(4)
- Headquarters: Washington, D.C., U.S.
- Coordinates: 38°53′58.6″N 77°02′27.4″W
- Executive Director: Corwin Albert "Corry" Bliss
- Chairman: Norm Coleman
- Subsidiaries: Congressional Leadership Fund _{(Super PAC)}
- Revenue: 57,008,925 USD (2025)
- Expenses: 74,225,611 USD (2025)
- Employees: 20 (2016)
- Volunteers: 10 (2016)
- Website: americanactionnetwork.org

The American Action Network (AAN) is a nonprofit, conservative issue advocacy group based in Washington, D.C., aligned with the Republican Party. It was established in 2010 by Fred Malek and Norm Coleman as a 501(c)(4) organization.

The AAN's sister organization, the American Action Forum, is a 501(c)(3) non-profit organization focusing on policy research. The American Action Forum is run by former Congressional Budget Office director Doug Holtz-Eakin. AAN officials also run the Congressional Leadership Fund, a super PAC (independent expenditure PAC) focused on electing a House Republican majority.

== History and organization ==
The American Action Network is an advocacy group, incorporated on July 23, 2009, and founded by Fred Malek, founder of Thayer Capital and former Republican National Committee deputy chairman. The organization says that it was founded to promote and support center right issues, conceived in part to counterbalance the liberal Center for American Progress. The organization calls itself an "action tank" or a "think-and-do-tank" and is classified as a 501(c)(4).

Former Minnesota senator Norm Coleman was hired in 2010 as its chief executive officer. He now serves as chairman of the board of directors and also serves on the board of directors of the American Action Forum, a sister organization. In 2011, Brian Walsh, a former political director at the National Republican Congressional Committee, was hired as the group's president, replacing Rob Collins, the former chief of staff to Eric Cantor. Walsh would serve as President of American Action Network until January 2015. The organization's board members include Fred Malek, Vin Weber, Mel Martinez and Thomas M. Reynolds. In January 2015, then Republican National Committee Chief of Staff Mike Shields stepped down in his role with the Republican National Committee to become President of American Action Network. In December 2016, Corwin Albert "Corry" Bliss was announced as the new executive director of American Action Network.

=== Funding and tax status ===
Donations to the American Action Network are not tax-deductible as charitable contributions due to its 501(c)(4) status, and the organization is not required to disclose the source of donations. Tax records show the group raised nearly $27.5 million between July 1, 2010, and June 30, 2011, including one $7 million donation. Critics of the American Action Network have argued that the organization's advertisements contravene its requirements under its 501(c)(4) status. Malek has stated in response that such claims are "baseless".

=== Related organizations ===
The American Action Forum is a partner organization with the American Action Network, operating as a separate 501(c)(3) organization. The focus of the Action Forum is policy research. Douglas Holtz-Eakin, the former director of the Congressional Budget Office, serves as its president.

Members of the American Action Network also run the Congressional Leadership Fund Super PAC which was formed in October 2011 for the purpose of supporting Republican candidates in House races. The organization aims to maintain the Republican House majority. The group held an event in November 2011 that included appearances from Speaker of the House John Boehner, House Majority Leader Eric Cantor and representative Pete Sessions from Texas. Board members include Fred Malek, Norm Coleman, Brian Walsh and former representative Tom Reynolds

In January 2011, the American Action Network created the Hispanic Leadership Network to bring more Hispanics to the Republican Party. According to the organization's website, the Hispanic Leadership Network is a "sustained effort to engage the Hispanic Community on center right issues". Key members include executive director Jennifer Korn, former Florida Governor Jeb Bush, former United States Attorney General Alberto Gonzales and former United States Secretary of Commerce Carlos Gutierrez.

== Activities ==
According to the American Action Network website, the organization's purpose is to "create, encourage and promote center-right policies." It aims to accomplish this through nationwide issue advocacy campaigns using print and television advertisements, direct mail, grassroots organizing, robocalls, online advertising and online videos.

In May 2011 Campaigns and Elections reported that the American Action Network spent more than $25 million in the 2010 election cycle. According to USA Today the organization spent $17 million on issue advocacy and grassroots organizing and $5.5 million on candidates and political activities. In the 2010 elections the group funded political advertisements in 22 congressional districts nationwide including Colorado, Connecticut, South Dakota, Utah, Washington state and Wisconsin.

In July 2012 Politico reported that the American Action Network planned to spend a minimum of $10 million to establish "a legislation-focused ground game in a number of states". The Politico article also called the American Action Network "one of the key outside forces on the right".

In July 2013 Politico reported that the group has spent more than $750,000 in ad buys on promoting the Gang of Eight immigration bill S.744.

On November 10, 2015, the group ran an ad during a Republican debate, arguing that the newly established Consumer Financial Protection Bureau was "designed to interfere with your personal financial decisions", and called upon viewers to ask Congress to shut down the CFPB "before they deny you". The ad was criticized by Senator Elizabeth Warren, who had advocated for the CFPB's creation and later served as its head before running for elected office. Senator Warren felt that it made her look like a "Commie dictator", and stated that "Thousands of dollars on a TV ad is nothing compared to the money the big banks save if their GOP buddies go after the CFPB."

On March 24, 2017, sports blog Deadspin reported that the group had been running local advertising in selected markets congratulating Republican members of Congress for helping pass a bill to repeal the Patient Protection and Affordable Care Act, despite the fact that the bill had been pulled earlier in the day by Speaker Paul Ryan due to dwindling support among Republicans. AAN stated to Deadspin that "Conservatives in and out of Congress continue to believe Obamacare has failed and will continue to fight for patient-centered reforms. Therefore, the claims in the ad remain true in spite of [these events]."

On February 25, 2019, the group published the article The Green New Deal: Scope, Scale, and Implications, showing detailed calculations estimating that the Green New Deal would cost at "least $50 trillion and possibly in excess of $90 trillion" by 2029. The article, however, did not consider any costs and damages resulting from inaction in tackling global warming and failed to discuss the proposal's crucial interconnections (e.g. those between guaranteed employment and housing or food security being guaranteed by said employment).

In 2022, Citizens for Responsibility and Ethics in Washington sued the Federal Election Commission for not pursuing allegations that AAN was required to publicly disclose its donors. In September 2023, the group announced that it would run $2 million worth of advertisements in 14 districts and Washington, D.C., claiming that Medicare benefits to older citizens were being cut.

As of August 2026, the organization spent $44.3 million in support of Republican candidates in the 2026 United States elections.
