= Aqua Sciences =

Aqua Sciences is a Miami Beach-based company providing advanced water technologies with a module capable of extracting up to 2500 gallons of water from the moisture present in the air.

== Module ==
The module is a modified 40-foot trailer that permits the extraction of water from the moisture in the air. It has options such as additional storage tanks for keeping the water for extended periods of time. It can be powered by an internal diesel generator for a week without needing to refuel, or plugged into the electrical grid. The module is the trailer of an 18-wheeler. It is possible to add a reverse osmosis module which increases production up to 8000 gallons a day.

== Advantages ==
There are no toxic or harmful byproducts. The only requirement for it is 14% humidity in the air, so it can be used in deserts. The water provided is also very pure.

== Applications ==
The United States Army has shown interest in the project, mainly because of the high cost of water transportation to its forces. Using the Aqua Sciences' module, that price is pushed down to $0.15 USD per gallon, which would provide huge logistic savings for the military. Also, it would be practical for providing water after a natural disaster such as the 2004 Indian Ocean earthquake or Hurricane Katrina.
