= Progress for America =

US political organization

Progress for America (PFA) (a 501(c)(4)) and its affiliate Progress for America Voter Fund (PFA-VF) (a 527 committee) was a national tax-exempt organizations in the United States. PFA was established in 2001 to support George W. Bush's "Agenda for America". The PFA Voter Fund, which was set up in 2004, raised US$38 million in support of Bush's 2004 election bid.

== History ==
PFA was registered as a 501(c)(4) group in February 2001 by Tony Feather, a political director of the Bush-Cheney 2000 campaign and partner at DCI Group as well as at the affiliated telemarketing and fundraising firm of Feather Larson Synhorst-DCI (FLS-DCI). Feather set up PFA as a "grassroots organization that mobilizes the public to contact their members of Congress about pending legislation and to write local newspapers to publicize the White House's agenda," the Center for Public Integrity wrote in 2002. During the first part of the Bush administration, it led campaigns to support tax cuts, conservative judicial appointments and energy legislation.

Feather told The Washington Post in August 2002 that PFA was simply a vehicle for building grassroots support for Bush administration policies. However others said it was intended to accept soft money donations which political parties were barred from accepting starting in 2002. Feather left PFA in 2003 after receiving a legal opinion that his involvement with it and the Bush-Cheney campaign could violate regulations barring coordination between the entities.

== PFA spin-offs and projects ==
=== Progress for America Voter Fund ===
On July 21, 2004, complaints were filed with the Federal Election Commission (FEC) by Democracy 21, the Campaign Legal Center, and OpenSecrets. The Complaints charged that Progress for America Voter Fund (PFA-VF) was illegally raising and spending soft money to influence the 2004 presidential elections.

On February 28, 2007, the Federal Election Commission (FEC) reached a settlement with Progress for America related to its activities in 2004. In the 2004 election cycle, the Fund had raised US$45 million. Under the terms of the settlement, PFA-VF did not admit to any wrongdoing, and agreed to pay US$750,000 and to register as a political committee if it undertakes any activities similar to those in 2004. The FEC stated: "Over US$41 million of those funds consisted of excessive contributions from individuals, while over US$2 million came from sources prohibited from making contributions . . . ."

=== Ashley and friends ===
PFA-VF spent US$14.2 million on ad time for "Ashley's Story", which ran on cable stations and in nine key states. According to USA Today, the ad was supported by ashleysstory.com, as well as "e-mails, automated phone calls and 2.3 million brochures" mailed to voters.

=== Push for privatized Social Security ===
After winning re-election in 2004, Bush emphasized changes in Social Security as a major domestic goal of his second term. He called for partial privatization of the system. PFA "has estimated it will spend US$20 million promoting private accounts. It has run a series of ads on cable television, including a spot that invokes the legacy of Democratic President Franklin Roosevelt, who signed the legislation creating the retirement system", the Houston Chronicle reported in February 2005.

In late February 2005, the Houston Chronicle reported that Texas A&M University economics professor Thomas R. Saving had joined up with Progress for America as an advisor and spokesman. Saving, however, is serving as one of seven trustees for the Social Security Administration, raising questions about potential conflicts of interest between his advocacy work at PFA and his role as a Social Security "trustee". Saving is also a fellow at the National Center for Policy Analysis. According to the Chronicle, former US Treasurer Rosario Marin joined PFA as an advisor as well.

"I'm interested in the issues and I'm working on them and I'll continue to work on them", Saving told the Chronicle. "I already do an awful lot of speeches about Social Security and Medicare."

=== Federal judicial battles ===
In May 2005, PFA began running ads targeted at pressuring Republicans Senators into supporting a ban on Senate filibusters for judicial nominations. Associated Press reported that PFA would spend US$350,000 on "radio ads on Christian stations" and US$1.5 million on television ads to be run in Alaska, Arkansas, Maine, North Dakota, Nebraska and Rhode Island as well as nationally.

In June 2005, The Hill reported that PFA intended to "spend at least US$18 million on the expected fight to replace William Rehnquist, chief justice of the US Supreme Court". PFA's campaign would include "national cable-news and broadcast-television ads in targeted states. The group will also coordinate grassroots organizers and public-relations specialists in eighteen states, including states represented by centrist Republican senators such as Arizona, Maine and Oregon" The Hill wrote. The groups will also use phone-bank and direct-mail in its campaign. "Before Senate confirmation of Owen and Brown, PFA claims to have helped generate nearly 80,000 telephone calls supporting their nominations", The Hill reported. PFA will work closely with the Judicial Confirmation Network and the Committee for Justice on the campaign.

On June 22, 2005, PFA issued a press release announcing a US$700,000 campaign in anticipation of a Supreme Court Justice vacancy during the Court's summer break. The campaign included buys on big newspapers' internet websites, and a roll-out of a new website: upordownvote.com.

=== Iraq War advertising campaign ===
Starting in 2006, Progress for America began an ad campaign in support of the Iraq War, with a US$1 million ad campaign in Minnesota. Progress for America spokesman Stuart Roy said the group purchased "a saturation buy" in Minnesota and said that bolstering support for the war now "will be a major focus, if not the major focus of Progress for America". These ads often feature war veterans speaking in support for the war and for then President Bush.
