= RightChange.com =

American conservative political group

RightChange.com was an American conservative political group. It was devoted to electing conservative U.S. Republican Party candidates, thus the reference to the political right in its name. It spent millions supporting Republican candidates in the 2010 general election.

It defined itself as an organization that "engages Americans through informed, fact-based content delivered in a creative format and through multimedia platforms to allow viewers to develop their own conclusions about the most critical economic and national security policies of our day. RightChange cuts through the political spin by using politicians’ own words, votes and actions to hold them accountable." Its funding mostly came from Fred Eshelman, a North Carolina pharmaceutical business owner.

== Campaigns and actions ==
In a last-minute campaign ad, RightChange used images from the September 2001 World Trade Center attacks to assert that Democratic presidential candidate Barack Obama would "undermine the terror strategy that protects us".

During the 2008 U.S. presidential election, RightChange sponsored television commercials and said that "For years, John McCain warned of Fannie Mae and Freddie Mac’s risk to the economy and pushed for reform" while "Democrats defended Fannie Mae and Freddie Mac." RightChange also attacked Democratic candidate Barack Obama, claiming that his "economic proposals stick small businesses with the Bill for the Wall Street Bailout."

The Associated Press reported on September 16, 2008, that RightChange.com "plans to spend about $1.5 million in the next two weeks on national cable networks including Fox News Channel, CNN, and CNN Headline News, said spokesman Tim Pittman. Rightchange.com is financed largely by pharmaceutical executive Fred Eshelman, who has given more than $200,000 to Republican candidates and party organizations since 2002, according to Federal Election Commission records.

The Tax Foundation, a tax research group based in Washington, D.C. that has been operating since 1937, analyzed the claims made by RightChange in one of its ads and concluded that they were "spreading nonsense ... so ridiculous that I'm almost at a loss for words ... an outright lie."

== Funding ==
According to National Public Radio, RightChange "reported $2.7 million in contributions from its president, Fred Eshelman, CEO of PPD, a pharmaceutical research firm in North Carolina. Eshelman donated $3.38 million to RightChange in 2010. PPD's chairman, Ernest Mario, gave an additional $1 million. Mario also runs Capnia Inc., a Palo Alto, Calif.-based company developing a system to treat migraines using medical gas." NPR noted that "RightChange.com's other directors also have connections to the health industry. Board member Jeff Barnhart is CEO of Cabarrus Community Health Centers, which RightChange's corporate secretary, Fletcher Hartsell, helped found. Both Barnhart and Hartsell are Republican state legislators in North Carolina."
