= Congressional Leadership Fund =

Republican House campaign Super PAC founded in 2011

- Abbreviation: CLF
- Formation: October 24, 2011; 14 years ago
- Type: Hybrid PAC
- Registration no.: C00504530
- Headquarters: Washington, D.C.
- Revenue: 243,241,867 USD (Jan 2023 to Dec 2024)
- Website: www.congressionalleadershipfund.org

The Congressional Leadership Fund (CLF) is a super PAC dedicated to electing Republicans to the U.S. House of Representatives. The super PAC, which was closely linked to former House speaker John Boehner and House GOP leadership, was founded in 2011 and spent nearly $10 million in the 2012 cycle electing Republican candidates. Following Boehner's resignation from Congress and the election of Paul Ryan as speaker of the House, it became closely linked to Ryan.

Of The Guardian's ranking of the "five most bigoted campaign ads" during the 2018 election campaign, four of the five were ads by the CLF. During the 2018 mid-term elections. CLF produced a number of false ads, including two that falsely linked two Democratic candidates with terrorists. In one ad, the CLF depicted Antonio Delgado, an African-American Rhodes scholar with a Harvard Law degree, as a foul-mouthed and "disturbingly radical" rapper, and misrepresented lyrics from his rap career.

== Leadership ==
- Former Minnesota senator Norm Coleman, chairman emeritus
- Fred Malek, chairman
- Former representative Thomas M. Reynolds, board member
- Former representative Vin Weber, board member
- Charlie Spies, senior adviser (former)
- Mason Fink, board member and finance director
- Daniel Conston, executive director
- William Inman, deputy executive director
- Patrick Lee, national field director
- Ruth Guerra, communications director
- Trent Edwards, development director (former)
- Caleb Crosby, treasurer

As of April 2019 the Congressional Leadership Fund does not list its leadership on its official website.

The board members are all members of the board of the American Action Network. The Super PAC is currently headed by Daniel Conston, who serves as executive director to both CLF and the linked American Action Network.

== Fundraising and spending ==
=== 2012 ===
According to records from the Federal Elections Commission, during the 2012 election cycle, CLF raised $11.3 million and spent $10.8 million. Of the 19 congressional races where CLF and the affiliated American Action Network paid for television ads, Republicans won 12 of the contests. The non-partisan Sunlight Foundation reported that CLF had a 58.05% return on investment in 2012.

Their largest donor was Sheldon Adelson, who gave $5 million in 2012. Other major donors included the late Texas home builder Bob J. Perry and Chevron.

=== 2014 ===
According to records from the Federal Election Commission, during the 2014 election cycle, CLF raised $12.6 million and spent $12.56 million.

=== 2016 ===
According to records from the Federal Elections Commission, during the 2016 election cycle, CLF raised just over $51.05 million and spent $50.05 million.

During the 2016 election, CLF used stolen hacked material in attacks ads against a Democratic candidate.

=== 2018 ===
In 2018, the CLF was described as "the highest-spending super PAC seeking to sway House races in the upcoming midterms." CLF was the largest Republican outside spender in the special election to fill Montana's at-large seat vacated by then Rep. Ryan Zinke after he was appointed to serve as Secretary of Interior by President Donald Trump. CLF invested $2.5 million in Montana to promote Greg Gianforte to the U.S. House of Representatives. Rep.-elect Gianforte was charged with assaulting a journalist at a rally on May 24, 2017, on the eve of the special election. Three of the state's largest newspapers, the Billings Gazette, the Missoulian and the (Helena) Independent Record, rescinded their endorsements of Gianforte shortly following the incident. Rep.-elect Gianforte was scheduled to appear in court before June 7, where he was required to answer an accusation that he "purposely or knowingly" caused "bodily injury to another". Rep. Elect Gianforte won slightly more than 50 percent of the vote to about 44 percent for Mr. Quist, the Democrat. President Trump won Montana by about 20 percentage points. On June 12, 2017, Gianforte pleaded guilty to misdemeanor assault and was sentenced to a 180-day deferred sentence, 40 hours of community service, 20 hours of anger management and a $300 fine along with an $85 court fee.

According to records from the Federal Elections Commission, as of June 6, 2017, Congressional Leadership Fund had made independent expenditures totaling just over $2.94 million in the Georgia 6th Congressional District Special Election against Democrat Jon Ossoff. CLF pledged $6.5 million to the special election in an attempt to keep the seat in control of the GOP after former HHS secretary Tom Price vacated the seat when he was nominated by President Donald Trump to head the Department of Health and Human Services. CLF repeatedly made the claim that San Francisco "Bay Area liberals have given more to Jon Ossoff's campaign than people in Georgia," a statement that has been rated false by the fact-checking website PolitiFact. A simple search through the Federal Elections Commission verifies PolitiFact's reporting.

The super PAC also made headlines in 2017 after it released its first ad against Democrat Jon Ossoff, with an ad featuring college video footage of Ossoff dressed up as Han Solo of Star Wars. The ad was the first significant spending from any outside GOP group.

In August 2018, Democratic candidate Abigail Spanberger accused CLF of being illicitly in possession of an unredacted federal security clearance application, which contains sensitive personal information, and that CLF had provided a copy of the sensitive information to at least one news outlet.

In The Guardian's ranking of the five most bigoted ads during the 2018 election campaign, four of the five were ads by the CLF. During the 2018 mid-term elections. CLF produced a number of false ads, including two that falsely linked two Democratic candidates with terrorists. In one ad, the CLF depicted Antonio Delgado, an African-American Rhodes scholar with a Harvard Law degree as a foul-mouthed and "disturbingly radical" rapper, and misrepresented lyrics from his rap career. CLF obtained the unredacted security clearance application of Abigail Spanberger, a former CIA officer and Democratic congressional candidate, and then used it for political purposes. CLF also sent the highly sensitive document to at least one media outlet. CLF then ran ads trying to link Spanberger to terrorist activity. Both Delgado and Spanberger went on to defeat incumbent Republicans for their respective House seats on November 6, 2018.

In the 2018 election cycle, the Congressional Leadership Fund raised $158 million and disbursed $159 million. Sheldon and Miriam Adelson gave $55 million of that.

=== 2022 ===
In the 2021–2022 cycle, CLF raised approximately $260.6 million and spent nearly the same amount—$260.0 million—with $227.3 million directed to independent expenditures. It targeted 62 Democratic candidates through independent spending, successfully contributing to the defeat of 25 of them. Additionally, CLF donated roughly $840,000 to the campaign committees of 102 Republican House candidates. Major donors included Ken Griffin, who contributed $18.5 million, and Patrick G. Ryan, who gave $10 million. The CLF’s sister organization, American Action Network, contributed nearly $20 million. In April 2022, CLF announced its first ad reservations, totaling $125 million for TV and streaming platforms across 46 districts—$111 million of which were reserved in Democratic-held districts (three times larger than its 2020 reservation).

=== 2023–2024 ===
For the 2023–2024 cycle, CLF raised $243.24 million and spent $242.60 million, ending the cycle with approximately $1.6 million cash on hand. Independent expenditures accounted for roughly $216.74 million. The group contributed $610,000 to Republican federal candidates, with no contributions to Democrats. In Q1 2024, CLF raised $25 million, with $65 million cash on hand, while the combined cycle-to-date fundraising with its affiliate AAN (American Action Network) reached $142 million, keeping pace with 2022’s record. Q2 2024 saw CLF raise $46.4 million—nearly double its Q2 2020 haul and slightly more than Q2 2022—allowing the combined CLF+AAN total to surpass $200 million in fundraising. In October 2024, CLF added $12 million in new ad reservations in key battleground districts—including those in Los Angeles, Harrisburg, Raleigh, and other markets—bringing active investment in House races to over $202 million.

=== 2025–present ===
In the first half of 2025, CLF (alongside AAN) raised an unprecedented $60 million, with CLF contributing $32.7 million and holding the same amount in cash on hand; AAN added $28 million. This haul exceeded by $25 million the combined midyear total from 2023. In December 2024, Dan Conston, long-time president of CLF and AAN, announced his departure after six years in leadership. Under his stewardship, Republicans secured narrow House majorities in both the 2022 and 2024 elections. Conston announced he would remain as a senior adviser. During his tenure, CLF and AAN collectively raised $871 million, cementing CLF as the largest outside spender in House races for Republicans.

== Comparison with similar organizations ==
The Congressional Leadership Fund (CLF) is considered the largest and most influential outside spender in U.S. House races for Republicans. It is often compared to its Democratic counterparts, such as the Democratic Congressional Campaign Committee (DCCC). Although the DCCC is an official party committee and operates differently from the CLF (which is a super PAC), both organizations represent the largest donors and influencers in House races. CLF can also be compared to the House Majority PAC, a Democratic super PAC dedicated to supporting Democratic House candidates. Historically, these two funds often compete to raise money and spend in the most critical and highly contested races. Generally, the CLF surpasses the House Majority PAC in annual spending volume, reflecting the Republican Party's significant prioritization of outside spending in House races.
