= DCI Group =

American public relations firm

- Industry: Public relations Lobbying
- Founded: 1996
- Founder: Tom Synhorst, Doug Goodyear and Tim Hyde
- Headquarters: Washington, D.C., United States
- Number of locations: Washington, D.C. and Phoenix, Arizona
- Key people: CEO Doug Goodyear; Managing Partner Justin Peterson; Managing Partner Brian McCabe
- Services: Communications services, lobbying, public affairs consulting
- Website: dcigroup.com

DCI Group is an American public relations, lobbying and business consulting firm based in Washington, D.C. The company was founded in 1996 as a consulting firm, and has since expanded its practice to become a public affairs company offering a range of services. DCI Group provides communications and advocacy services to clients including large US corporations, trade associations, non-profit organizations, educational institutions, and government organizations. Services include communication campaigns to solicit public action on legislative issues, including, it has been alleged, the creation of grass-roots fronts for corporate campaigns, and campaigns for clients on social media websites. DCI has been described as having "a knack for creating grassroots organizations and recruiting third party allies to advocate for a cause or an issue".

In 2006, DCI was described as a "Republican public relations firm" by ABC News, and in 2016 it was described as a "conservative public affairs powerhouse" by O'Dwyers although the firm has worked on both conservative and bipartisan causes, assisting LGBT advocacy group Human Rights Campaign to build support for repealing the military's "Don't Ask, Don't Tell" policy for gay and lesbian personnel, supporting legislation regulating the fees that banks can charge retailers and other customers for using debit cards, and helping environmentalists to lobby against mining in northeastern Minnesota.

== Services ==
DCI Group provides public relations, communications, government affairs and lobbying, and business consulting services. In addition, the firm develops and manages grassroots communications campaigns. The firm is structured into five areas of work: public relations, message development, DCI Digital, Field Force (the grassroots division), and Strategic Alliances (constituency relationships).

DCI Group's main areas of expertise are in public relations and communications. In 2000, DCI Group began publishing an online magazine, Tech Central Station, "hosted" by James K. Glassman. In its original incarnation, TCS was primarily funded by sponsors, including some DCI clients, a fact reported in the Washington Monthly. The magazine reached a readership of around 100,000 per week by September 2006, when it was sold by DCI to its editor, Nick Shulz.

== History ==
DCI Group was founded in 1996, by Tom Synhorst, Doug Goodyear and Tim Hyde, as a grassroots consulting firm based in Washington, D.C., and Phoenix, Arizona. Early work included organizing leadership seminars for corporate and political leaders, plus direct mail, telephone and grassroots communications. In the early 2000s, the firm launched its government affairs practice to provide advocacy services for clients, including companies such as AT&T and institutions such as the University of Arizona.

By 2005 the company had more than a hundred employees, and counted blue-chip and Fortune 50 companies among its clients. Notable clients have included Microsoft, VeriChip Corporation, Boeing, General Motors, and the U.S. Telecom Association.

In addition to its client campaigns, DCI's digital team has carried out research into the use of social media. In early 2011 it released a report which compared the use of social media services such as Twitter and Facebook on a state-by-state basis.

== Notable work ==
=== Early 2000s ===
Several DCI partners and executives had roles advocating for George W. Bush in the 2000 United States presidential election. Many of those same individuals similarly advocated for Bush's reelection in the 2004 United States presidential election, with DCI Group providing contractual services for the 2004 Republican National Convention.

DCI's first overseas project came in 2002, when DCI Group was hired by Myanmar's military junta, following the release of political prisoners in the state, including Aung San Suu Kyi. DCI's work for the government included public relations efforts to improve the leadership's image in the U.S., raising the profile of more moderate officials and emphasizing its negotiations with Suu Kyi. According to media reports, the firm was paid $348,000 to represent the Myanmar government. DCI Group ended its contract with the Myanmar government in 2003.

Also among DCI's earlier public relations campaigns was the 2006 launch of Aqua Sciences' water harvesting technology, which was named by Time magazine as one of its best inventions of 2006. DCI Group offers a number of different communications services, including corporate communication, crisis management, new media development and message development. The company was also retained by the LGBT advocacy group Human Rights Campaign to build support for repealing the military's "Don't Ask, Don't Tell" policy related to gay and lesbian personnel. Also in 2006, authorship of a popular YouTube video parodying Al Gore's global warming documentary An Inconvenient Truth was alleged to have been traced back to DCI Group through routing information in e-mails from the author to The Wall Street Journal. The alleged production of the video by DCI Group led to critical coverage of the company in the media, due in part to its work for ExxonMobil. DCI Group did not admit or deny involvement with the video. In addition to its traditional public relations and communications work, it was asserted that the firm engaged in "astroturfing", i.e. the creation of front groups that serve corporate interests while posing as grassroots activists. This type of campaigning was alleged to be an early focus for the firm, which has continued to develop and manage such campaigns using such strategies as direct mail and social media.

=== Late 2000s to early 2010s ===
In 2008 it was reported that the company had done extensive work for federal mortgage company Freddie Mac, running a multi-state effort against Republican Senator Chuck Hagel's bill to tightly regulate the company. Freddie Mac acknowledged the hire, and DCI stated it had complied with "all applicable federal and state laws and regulations". In May 2008, DCI Group's Doug Goodyear and Doug Davenport resigned from the John McCain presidential campaign following media coverage that was critical of the company's past work for the Myanmar government. According to Goodyear, they resigned in order to prevent further distraction from McCain's campaign.

In the late 2000s, DCI mobilized employees of the Education Management Corporation against a proposed regulation focused on for-profit colleges. It was one part of an overall industry effort that resulted in more than 90,000 comments being received by the Department of Education, more than for any previous rule. In 2011, the company produced a campaign for the Retail Industry Leaders Association, arranging for small business owners to meet with their senators and holding press events, as part of the organization's campaign supporting the Durbin Amendment regulating bank debit card transaction fees. DCI Group was recognized for its work on the effort, with Bloomberg News writing: "Within a few months, DCI Group, a Washington-based public affairs firm hired by the retailers, assembled an e-mail list of more than 20 million small-business owners. They arranged 23 meetings between merchants and senators or their aides and held press events in Tennessee, Ohio and Wisconsin -- home to senators on the Banking Committee". The Hill named the passage of the amendment the top lobbying victory of 2011.

During that same period, when T. Boone Pickens sought to develop support for replacing coal and oil with natural gas as the primary fuel source in the United States, he engaged DCI Group to build support for the effort. Pickens turned to trusted counselor Jay Rosser for this effort, and Rosser "reached out to Tom Synhorst, managing partner and chairman of DCI Group". DCI "signed up on the spot after hearing Mr. Pickens's vision for the campaign", and Synhorst then "became the quarterback" and with Rosser, "assembled a powerhouse research, creative, public relations and online team". In the 2010s, the firm also assisted proponents of palm oil in countering negative views of the product, highlighting the importance of the crop to small farmers in the affected countries.

In 2013, the Corporate Europe Observatory reported that DCI Group has also had close ties to the European Privacy Association, an EU lobby group. EDRi asserts that EPA has used the services of both DCI and an Italian lobbying firm, Competere, the staff of which "overlaps" with DCI Group.

=== Mid-2010s to present ===
In 2015–16 in the negotiations regarding the Puerto Rican government-debt crisis, DCI reportedly worked with BlueMountain Capital, as well as the Raben Group and the 60 Plus Association in focusing opposition to Congressional approval of the bankruptcy option for the commonwealth.

Following the election of Donald Trump in 2016, DCI, based on its history as an organizer of Fannie Mae and Freddie Mac shareholders, was brought into a coalition formed by investor John Paulson having the goal of bringing about investor-friendly changes to the national mortgage markets.

In 2018, DCI registered as a lobbyist on behalf of Process and Industrial Developments Ltd., an energy company that had successfully sued the Nigerian government for billions of dollars for work on a project in that country, and which sought to persuade the Nigerian government to honor the judgment awarded. In January 2020, it was reported that an environmental group had secured the services of DCI Group to help lobby against mining in northeastern Minnesota.

It was reported in 2024 that DCI was being investigated by the FBI for hacking while working on behalf of ExxonMobil between 2015 and 2018.

The DCI Group has agreed to represent the Myanmar Ministry of Information again in lobbying for the military junta to rebuild relations with the United States.
