= DonorsTrust =

American nonprofit donor-advised fund

- Formation: 1999
- Type: Nonprofit (IRC § 501(c)(3))
- Tax ID no.: 52-2166327
- Location: Alexandria, Virginia, U.S.
- Coordinates: 38.8056°N 77.0603°W
- Services: Donor-advised fund
- CEO: Lawson Bader
- Board of directors: Kimberly Dennis; James Piereson; Lawson Bader; Thomas Beach; George G. H. Coates Jr.
- Affiliations: Donors Capital Fund
- Revenue: $294 million (2024)
- Expenses: $292 million (2024)
- Endowment: $1.36 billion in assets (2024)
- Website: donorstrust.org

DonorsTrust is an American nonprofit donor-advised fund that was founded in 1999 with the goal of "safeguarding the intent of libertarian and conservative donors". As a donor-advised fund, DonorsTrust is not legally required to disclose the identity of its donors, and most of its donors remain anonymous. It distributes funds to various conservative and libertarian 501(c)(3) organizations.

It is affiliated with Donors Capital Fund, another donor-advised fund. In September 2015, Lawson Bader was announced as the new president of both DonorsTrust and Donors Capital Fund. Bader was formerly president of the Competitive Enterprise Institute and vice president at the Mercatus Center.

== Overview ==
DonorsTrust is a 501(c)(3) organization. As a public charity and a donor-advised fund, DonorsTrust offers clients a variety of tax advantages compared to a private foundation.

DonorsTrust accepts donations from charitable foundations and individuals. Grants from DonorsTrust are based on the preferences of the original contributor, and the organization assures clients that their contributions will never be used to support politically liberal causes. As a donor-advised fund, DonorsTrust can offer anonymity to individual donors, with respect to their donations to DonorsTrust, as well as with respect to an individual donor's ultimate grantee.

As a donor-advised fund and public charity, DonorsTrust accepts cash or assets from donors, and in turn creates a separate account for the donor, who may recommend disbursements from the fund to other public charities. DonorsTrust requires an initial deposit of $10,000 or more. DonorsTrust is associated with Donors Capital Fund. DonorsTrust refers clients to Donors Capital Fund if the client plans to maintain a balance of $1 million or more. DonorsTrust president Lawson Bader said the goal of the organization is to "safeguard the intent of libertarian and conservative donors," ensuring that funds are used only to promote "liberty through limited government, responsibility, and free enterprise".

== History ==
DonorsTrust was established in 1999 by Whitney Lynn Ball. It and Donors Capital Fund have been described as spinoffs of the Philanthropy Roundtable, a coordinating group for conservative foundations, where Ball had been executive director. According to DonorsTrust, the organization was founded by a group of donors and nonprofit executives who were "actively engaged in supporting and promoting a free society as understood in America's founding documents." A major selling point to donors is that even after their death, their money will continue to fund conservative/libertarian goals, and not change based on the attitudes of their heirs or trustees as a family foundation might.

In early 2013, DonorsTrust was the subject of reports by The Independent, The Guardian, Mother Jones, and the Center for Public Integrity. Calling it the "dark money ATM" of the political right, the progressive magazine Mother Jones said DonorsTrust had funded a conservative public policy agenda against labor unions, climate science, public schools, and economic regulations.

DonorsTrust raised over $1 billion in 2021, with two separate donations, each exceeding $425 million, being anonymous.

In 2026, amidst threats from the Trump administration to revoke tax-exempt status from liberal nonprofits, DonorsTrust president and CEO Lawson Bader took part in a Cato Institute event about defending nonprofit rights. MacArthur Foundation president John Palfrey also spoke at the event. Bader and Palfrey agreed that the government should stay out of how donors and nonprofits choose to give, regardless of political ideology.

== Donors ==
As of 2013, DonorsTrust had 193 contributors, mostly individuals, and some foundations.

The Charles G. Koch Foundation has contributed millions of dollars to DonorsTrust. Charles and David Koch were the top contributors to DonorsTrust in 2011, according to an analysis by the Columbia Journalism Review.

DonorsTrust account holders have included the John M. Olin Foundation, the Castle Rock Foundation, the Searle Freedom Trust, and the Bradley Foundation. The Bradley family contributed $650,000 between 2001 and 2010. The DeVos family foundation contributed $1 million in 2009 and $1.5 million in 2010 to Donors Trust.

Robert Mercer and Rebekah Mercer contributed nearly $20 million through DonorsTrust in 2020. Marble Freedom Trust, led by Leonard Leo, gave $41 million to DonorsTrust in 2021 after a donation from Barre Seid.

== Recipients ==
From its founding in 1999 through 2013, DonorsTrust and Donors Capital Fund distributed nearly $400 million, and through 2015, $740 million, to various nonprofit organizations, including numerous conservative and libertarian causes. DonorsTrust requires that recipients are registered with the US Internal Revenue Service as a 501(c)(3) public charity. Whitney Ball, the former president of the Trust, told The Guardian in 2013 that it has about 1,600 grantees. In 2014, Ball said that 70 to 75 percent of grants go to public policy organizations, with the rest going to more conventional charities such as social service and educational organizations.

In 2010, the Americans for Prosperity Foundation received a DonorsTrust grant of $7 million, nearly half of the Foundation's revenue that year. Other DonorsTrust recipients have included The Heritage Foundation, Americans for Tax Reform, the National Rifle Association Freedom Action Foundation, the Competitive Enterprise Institute, the Cato Institute, the Federalist Society, the FreedomWorks Foundation, the National Right to Work Legal Defense Foundation, and the Center for Class Action Fairness.

DonorsTrust paid the legal fees of the Project on Fair Representation, a Washington, D.C.–based legal defense fund that assembled the plaintiff's legal team in Fisher v. University of Texas, a 2013 United States Supreme Court case concerning affirmative action college admissions policies. In 2011, the Franklin Center for Government and Public Integrity, an online conservative news organization, received $6.3 million in DonorsTrust and Donors Capital Fund grants, 95 percent of the center's revenue that year.

Other DonorsTrust recipients have included the Becket Fund for Religious Liberty, the Conservative Partnership Institute, Consumers' Research, Families Against Mandatory Minimums, the Foundation for Jewish Camp, the James Randi Educational Foundation, the Marijuana Policy Project, the New Century Foundation, PragerU, Project Veritas, and VDARE.

DonorsTrust CEO Bader told Inside Philanthropy in 2021 that his fund had seen "a noticeable uptick of account rollovers" from non-ideological donor-advised funds he said had slowed or stopped grant-making to political causes.

=== Climate change related funding ===
DonorsTrust and Donors Capital Fund have sourced donor contributions to conservative groups with denialist stances on climate change.

The Guardian reported DonorsTrust and Donors Capital Fund distributed nearly $120 million to 102 think tanks and action groups "which have a record of denying the existence of a human factor in climate change, or opposing environmental regulations" between 2002 and 2010. According to an analysis by Drexel University environmental sociologist Robert Brulle, between 2003 and 2010, DonorsTrust and Donors Capital Fund combined were the largest funders of organizations opposed to restrictions on carbon emissions. By 2009, approximately one-quarter of the funding of what Brulle calls the "climate change counter-movement" came from grants via DonorsTrust and Donors Capital Fund.

As of 2010, DonorsTrust grants to conservative and libertarian organizations active in climate change issues included more than $17 million to the American Enterprise Institute, a think tank; $13.5 million to the Heartland Institute, a public policy think tank; and $11 million to Americans for Prosperity, a political advocacy group. In 2011, the Committee for a Constructive Tomorrow (CFACT), a conservative Washington, D.C.–based nonprofit organization, received $1.2 million from Donors Trust, 40 percent of CFACT's revenue in that year. Climate change writer Wei-Hock "Willie" Soon received hundreds of thousands of dollars from DonorsTrust. In 2015, The Guardian reported that Donors Trust gave $4.3 million to the Competitive Enterprise Institute over three years.

=== State-based policy funding ===
Between 2008 and 2013, DonorsTrust granted $10 million to the State Policy Network (SPN), a national network of conservative and libertarian think tanks focused on state-level policy. SPN used the grants to incubate new think tanks in Arkansas, Rhode Island and Florida. DonorsTrust also issued grants to SPN's affiliates at the state level during the same period. DonorsTrust continued to be a leading funder of the State Policy Network in later years, contributing more than $9 million in 2021 and more than $8.5 million in 2022. The American Legislative Exchange Council, a nonprofit organization of conservative state legislators and private sector representatives that drafts and shares model state-level legislation, is a DonorsTrust recipient.

=== Elections and the judiciary ===
In 2018, the organization funded more than 99% of the Judicial Education Project, a legal alias for Honest Elections Project and The 85 Fund.

== Board of directors ==
The board of directors of DonorsTrust includes:

- Kimberly Dennis, chairman – president of the Searle Freedom Trust
- Lawson Bader, president and CEO – DonorsTrust and Donors Capital Fund
- James Piereson, vice chairman – conservative scholar and president of the William E. Simon Foundation
- Thomas E. Beach
- George G.H. Coates Jr. – chairman of the Commonwealth Foundation for Public Policy Alternatives
