= Foundation for Accountability and Civic Trust =

United States nonprofit

- Formation: 2012
- Founder: Ray Wotring
- Type: 501(c)(3)
- Location: Washington, D.C.
- Leader: Kendra Arnold
- Website: www.factdc.org

Foundation for Accountability and Civic Trust (FACT), formerly the Free Market American Educational Foundation, Foundation for Accountability and Civic Trust and Working for Rights to Express & Communication, is a Washington, D.C.–based conservative nonprofit organization specializing in advocacy regarding legal and ethical issues related to politics. Until 2017, it was run by the former Acting United States Attorney General Matthew Whitaker.

== Overview ==
The conservative group Donors Trust was the source of $500,000 of FACT's revenue in 2015 and $800,000 in 2016. As a 501(c)(3) organization, FACT is not required to disclose donors; however, Charles Koch has acknowledged giving to DonorsTrust. FACT paid Whitaker $1.2 million, with the vast majority of the payments from 2016 to 2017.

FACT has largely focused on Hillary Clinton and the email scandal, and other Democratic representatives such as Senator Evan Bayh of Indiana, Representative Patrick E. Murphy of Florida and Representative Ted Strickland of Ohio. FACT lobbied against the confirmation of one-time Supreme Court nominee Merrick Garland, and filed an FEC complaint against Democratic voter data firm Catalist in 2015. Despite claiming to be nonpartisan, the organization called for ethics investigations into or filed complaints about forty-six different Democratic politicians, officials, and organizations, compared to only a few Republicans. During his tenure, Whitaker wrote opinion pieces that appeared in USA Today and The Washington Examiner, and appeared regularly on conservative talk-radio shows and cable news. In 2017, Whitaker (as executive director) wrote:

The most disturbing aspect of Hillary Clinton’s continued blame game is that she still doesn’t think there was anything wrong with recklessly handling highly sensitive and classified information, intentionally instructing her staff to do the same and then lying to the entire world about it at the United Nations of all places.

In addition, FACT filed a complaint in August 2017 with the Federal Election Commission (FEC) against the Democratic National Committee (DNC) and Alexandra Chalupa, a consultant working for the DNC who had been investigating Paul Manafort and Donald Trump's ties to Russia. Whitaker made the complaint at the direction of the White House. FACT acted in close concert with Senator Chuck Grassley, who also made a complaint with the DOJ. FACT's complaint was based on the claim that Chalupa had met with Ukrainian officials in an effort to expose ties among Trump, Manafort, and Russia. As of December 2018 the FEC had given no indication whether it would investigate the issue. Chalupa denied any wrongdoing.

In 2016, Whitaker defended ExxonMobil as the executive director of FACT when the Attorneys General United for Clean Power Coalition started their investigation into the firm for not disclosing climate change risks. Whitaker called the investigation "both unconstitutional and unethical". The investigation has since matured leading to four counts of fraud being filed against ExxonMobil.

In 2018, FACT scrutinised a pro Rick Scott Political action committee.

FACT has paid outside Republican firms to perform some of its work. One such firm is America Rising LLC, which was given $144,000 for research in 2015. FACT paid America Rising at least $500,000 for research from 2015 to 2017. FACT also had close working relationship with America Rising, sharing information and political communication strategy. The foundation last year paid $134,119 to Creative Response Concepts, a conservative political public relations company and has paid a total of $500,000 to the agency.

Some experts such as Daniel Borochoff, president of CharityWatch, have questioned the status of FACT, saying that the organization may have violated its tax-exempt status. FACT has called for ethical investigations or filed complaints against over 46 individuals or organizations, the vast majority of whom are either Democrats or associated with Democratic causes.

== Personnel ==
Kendra Arnold is currently the executive director; previously, she was the general counsel.

FACT's treasurer was Neil Corkery from 2015 to 2016 whose wife established the Judicial Crisis Network. Neil Corkery is now treasurer for Public Interest Legal Foundation. Corkey was part of the three person board of directors at FACT including Whitaker.

William (Bill) Gustoff serves on the board of directors of FACT and was a former law partner of Matthew Whitaker for Whitaker Hagenow & Gustoff LLP (which changed its name later to Hagenow & Gustoff LLP and Hagenow Gustoff & Karas LLP). Kendra Arnold worked for Whitaker Hagenow & Gustoff LLP under Matthew Whitaker.

Matthew Whitaker was executive director from October 2014 to September 2017.

James Crumley has been a director. Noah Wall was a director in 2014.

Thomas Raymond Conlon has managed the tax returns of FACT. He is also responsible for other prominent groups such as American Conservative Union and Judicial Crisis Network, which are organizations associated with Ann and Neil Corkery.
