= BH Group =

American company

BH Group is a for-profit limited liability corporation registered in Virginia in August 2016. Partly owned by longtime Federalist Society executive Leonard Leo, it was the sister group of the BH Fund and is closely related to the Wellspring Committee. BH Group is compensated by The 85 Fund and Concord Fund, which are operated by Leo associates.

== Funding ==
Between 2016 and 2018, the BH Group received $4 million from the Concord Fund (formerly Judicial Crisis Network), The 85 Fund (formerly Judicial Education Project), and the Wellspring Committee. Robert Maguire of McClatchy DC has described it as a shell company, a pass-through vehicle, and an entity that was likely created to conceal the identities of a donor.

In November 2017, the Wellspring Committee filed tax documents showing a $750,000 payment to BH Group firm for public relations. The BH Group does not appear to market itself as a public relations firm, has no known website, and does not advertise its services. Similarly, Wellspring Committee, a nonprofit, has no known public-facing operations, no website, and three employees. In 2018, the BH Group received nearly $919,000 from the Wellspring Committee, the primary funder of the Judicial Crisis Network.

In 2018, the Judicial Crisis Network also reported paying BH Group $1.2 million in consulting fees.

In 2018, the Rule of Law Trust paid the BH Group $4 million for consulting services. The Rule of Law Trust is an $80 million trust with no employees; its sole trustee is Leonard Leo.

== Activities ==
The BH Group is connected to the non-profit BH Fund, which distributed money to Leo's network of groups supporting president Donald Trump's Supreme Court nominees. The BH Fund was formed in 2016 with $24 million from a single unknown donor, and has donated more than $3 million to the Freedom and Opportunity Fund and America Engaged, both of which are partially controlled by Leo. The BH Fund was dissolved in 2017, three days after Politico inquired as to whether it facilitated the sale of The Polling Company, owned by Trump advisor Kellyanne Conway, to Creative Response Concepts, which is linked to Leo. Conway was advising Trump on Supreme Court nominees at the time.

The BH Fund is responsible for enforcing a donation agreement between an anonymous $20 million donor and the Antonin Scalia Law School at George Mason University.

In December 2016, the BH Group donated $1 million to Donald Trump's inaugural committee.

The Honest Elections Project, an alias of the Judicial Education Project/Judicial Crisis Network, has also paid money to the BH Group. The Honest Election Project, which has expressed the view that voter suppression is a "myth," has filed court briefs "in favor of voting restrictions" in Nevada, Virginia, Texas, Wisconsin and Minnesota. The Guardian wrote that "[by] having a hand in both voting litigation and the judges on the federal bench, this network could create a system where conservative donors have an avenue to both oppose voting rights and appoint judges to back that effort."

== Employees ==
Leonard Leo is an employee of the BH Group and the president of the BH Fund.

== See also ==
- Dark money
