= Freddoso =

Freddoso is a surname. Notable people with the surname include:

- Alfred J. Freddoso (born 1946), American philosopher
- David Freddoso (born 1976), American political conservative commentator, journalist, and author, son of Alfred
