= Carrie Campbell Severino =

American political activist

Carrie Severino
- Born: Carrie Campbell; 1976 or 1977 (age 48–49)
- Education: Duke University (BA); Michigan State University (MA); Harvard University (JD)
- Spouse: Roger Severino

Carrie Campbell Severino (born 1976/1977) is an American lawyer and conservative political activist. She is the president of the Concord Fund, where she supported the Supreme Court nominations of Amy Coney Barrett and Brett Kavanaugh. She is the coauthor (with Mollie Hemingway) of Justice on Trial: The Kavanaugh Confirmation and the Future of the Supreme Court.

== Background and early career ==
Severino, born Carrie Campbell, grew up in Michigan. Her father is an oncologist, and her mother is a nurse.

Severino attended Duke University, graduating in 1999 with a B.A. in biology. In 2001 she received a master's degree in Linguistics from Michigan State University.

While attending Harvard Law School, she met her future husband Roger Severino, two years ahead of her there. Both were active with the law school's Society for Law, Life and Religion, a conservative pro-life group.

In 2004, after receiving her JD from Harvard Law School, Severino worked as a law clerk for Judge David B. Sentelle of the U.S. Court of Appeals for the D.C. Circuit.

She was a law clerk to U.S. Supreme Court Justice Clarence Thomas for a year (2007–2008). She later spent time at Georgetown University Law Center with an Olin/Searle Fellowship, an award funded by the Federalist Society that "offers top young lawyers with a scholarly bent the opportunity to spend 1-2 years to write and develop their scholarship with the goal of entering the legal academy."

== Judicial Crisis Network ==
On March 22, 2010, the Judicial Crisis Network (now called the Concord Fund) hired Severino as their policy director and chief spokesperson.

The Concord Fund is an American conservative advocacy organization, described in 2020 by OpenSecrets as having "unmatched influence in recent years in shaping the federal judiciary." JCN has worked closely on judicial appointments with conservative Catholic activist Leonard Leo and with the Federalist Society, which is in the same hallway of a DC office building. In 2022, JCN's "About" page describes her role as "chief counsel and policy director."

Severino and the Concord Fund have played a prominent role in several political battles related to the United States Supreme Court. In 2016, Mother Jones described Severino as "a leader of the current conservative campaign to block any Obama Supreme Court nominee." Under her leadership, the Judicial Crisis Network spent more than $5 million on the campaign to oppose Obama's 2016 nomination of Merrick Garland for the Supreme Court.

During the 2016 Presidential election Severino and the Judicial Crisis Network made filling the seat to which Garland had been nominated a central issue. Asserting that Trump's victory reflected voters' wish for conservatives on the Supreme Court, Severino announced JCN's plan to spend $10 million campaigning for Neil Gorsuch's appointment. Severino attended the White House swearing-in ceremony for Gorsuch.

Severino also played a prominent role in the Judicial Crisis Network campaign to support the confirmation of Brett Kavanaugh to the U.S. Supreme Court, on which JCN spent $4.5 million in ad buys. In an appearance on CNN, Severino defended Kavanaugh from allegations of sexual assault by Christine Blasey Ford, saying that the allegation "covered a whole range of conduct, from boorishness to rough horseplay to actual attempted rape." Jia Tolentino, writing in The New Yorker, criticized the "horseplay" comment as minimizing what Tolentino described as "sexual assault."

In September 2020, after the death of Supreme Court Justice Ruth Bader Ginsburg, Severino and Judicial Crisis Network enlisted support from what Severino called a "war room" of pro-Catholic and pro-business advocacy groups including the Susan B. Anthony List, Catholic Vote, America First Policies, the Club for Growth and Heritage Action. The Judicial Crisis Network launched a $2.2 million campaign to support President Trump's right to appoint a judge prior to the November 2020 presidential election.

In a widely reported presentation to the Judiciary Committee during confirmation hearings for Amy Coney Barrett, Senator Sheldon Whitehouse singled out Severino by name as a major player in what he called "a $250 million dark money operation" to influence the selection of judges. Severino defended the practice of groups such as the JCN receiving funding from anonymous donors, saying that the goal of anonymity was not secrecy, but rather to protect her donors from "harassment" if their names were made public.

== Justice on Trial ==
Severino is the coauthor (with Mollie Hemingway) of Justice on Trial: The Kavanaugh Confirmation and the Future of the Supreme Court (2019). According to The Washingtonian, the book "hit bestseller lists" in the summer of 2019. The book attracted both positive and negative comments.

James R. Copeland in the Washington Post called the book "a must-read for those who follow the politics of the federal judiciary", saying that "Hemingway and Severino frame the Kavanaugh story in the broader judicial confirmation context" beginning with 1987's fight over Robert Bork and covering what he calls "the campaign against Severino’s mentor [Justice Clarence] Thomas four years later."

John Kass in the Chicago Tribune called it a "highly readable bestseller" that "starts out like a thriller — with the fate of the republic in the balance."

Lara Bazelon in Politico criticized the book as "so one-sided that it read more like a legal brief written by two very competent and fiercely committed advocates" but added that "Hemingway and Severino do make important points" concerning the presumption of innocence.

== Personal life ==
Severino is married to Roger Severino, the former head of the Department of Health and Human Services’s Office for Civil Rights. They have six children. Both Severinos are conservative Roman Catholics.
