= Roger Severino =

American lawyer and government official

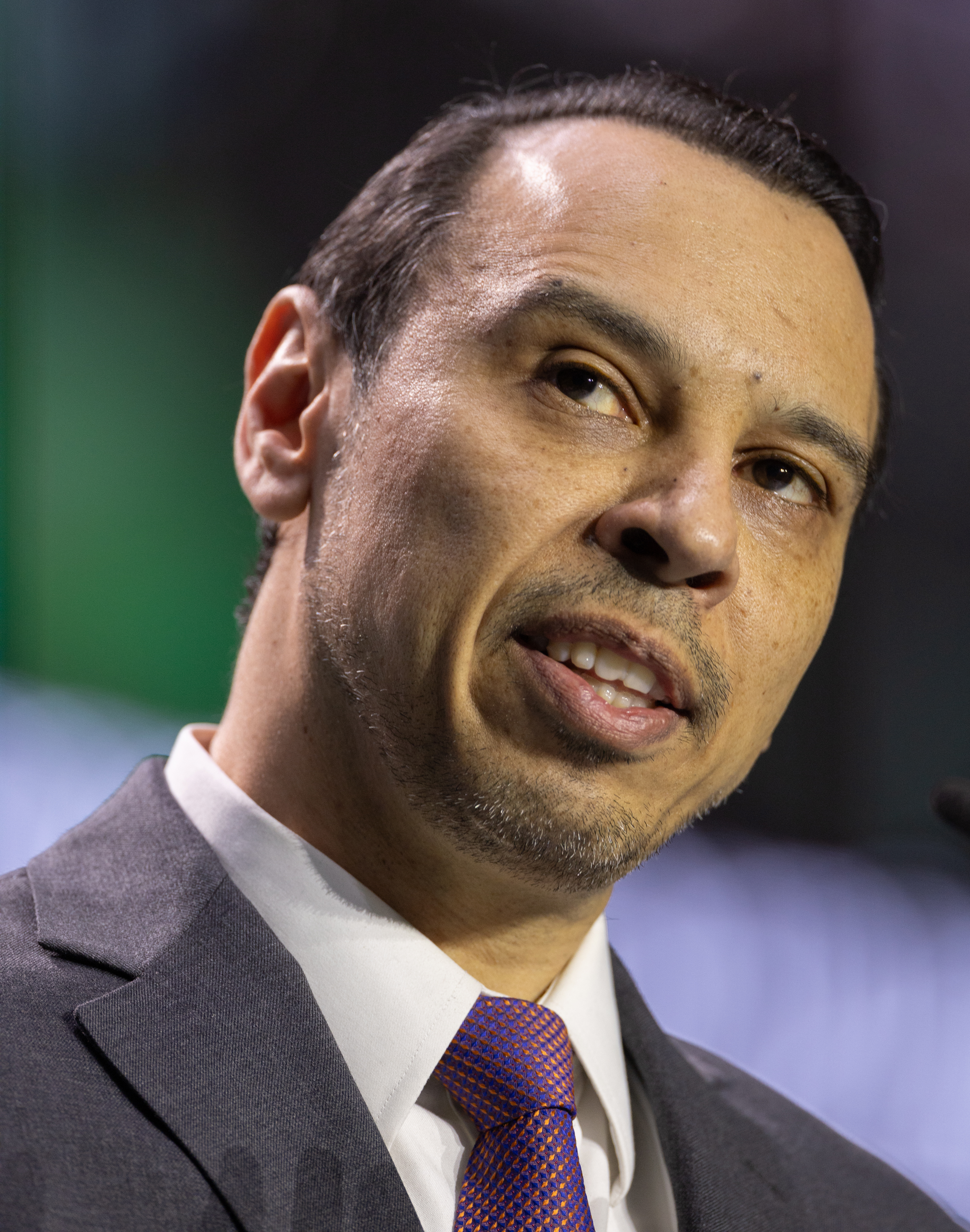
- Severino in 2024

Director of the U.S. Department of Health and Human Services Office for Civil Rights
- In office 2017–2021
- President: Donald Trump
- Preceded by: Jocelyn Samuels
- Succeeded by: Lisa J. Pino

Personal details
- Born: Roger Thomas Severino; 1974 or 1975 (age 50–51)
- Party: Republican
- Spouse: Carrie Campbell (m. 2004)
- Education: University of Southern California (BBA); Carnegie Mellon University (MPP); Harvard University (JD)

Roger Thomas Severino (born 1974/1975) is an American attorney who served as the director of the Office of Civil Rights (OCR) at the United States Department of Health and Human Services from 2017 to 2021. He is currently a senior fellow at the Ethics and Public Policy Center and a contributor on health policy, including abortion, to Project 2025.

== Early life and education ==
Severino, the son of immigrants from Colombia, was raised in Los Angeles. He received a bachelor's degree in business from University of Southern California, a Master of Public Administration from Carnegie Mellon University, and a Juris Doctor from Harvard Law School.

== Career ==
From 2008 to 2015, Severino was a trial attorney in the United States Department of Justice Civil Rights Division. Severino was also previously CEO and counsel for the Becket Fund for Religious Liberty, a nonprofit law firm taking on cases related to freedom of religion. In 2015, Severino joined The Heritage Foundation, a conservative think tank geared towards public policy. There, he served as the director of the DeVos Center for Religion and Civil Society at The Heritage Foundation. Severino has written several opinion columns for The Daily Signal. Severino has also written for Public Discourse: Ethics, Law, and the Common Good, a journal published by the Witherspoon Institute, a conservative think-tank.

In 2023, Severino contributed abortion policies to the Heritage Foundation's Project 2025, a plan prepared for an incoming Republican president.

=== Department of Health and Human Services ===
In March 2017, President Donald Trump appointed Severino as Director of the Office for Civil Rights at the United States Department of Health and Human Services. He left the position on January 15, 2021.

A social conservative and devout Catholic, Severino has often been criticized for being anti-LGBT. The Human Rights Campaign has described Severino as a "radical anti-LGBTQ activist." In 2018, Severino called the Obama administration's expansion of sex to include gender identity "radical gender ideology." In an op-ed co-written by former U.S. Senator Jim DeMint, Severino said that "transgender rights supporters see sex as 'merely a placeholder' assigned at birth."

As director of the HHS Office for Civil Rights, Severino removed nondiscrimination protections for LGBTQ people established in the Patient Protection and Affordable Care Act. Removing the provision allowed healthcare providers to deny care based on a patient's sexuality or gender identity.

In July 2020, Trump nominated Severino for a three-year position on the Council of the Administrative Conference of the United States. Severino was commissioned in January 2021, in the final days of Trump's presidency, and in February, filed a lawsuit in federal court claiming the Biden administration offered him an ultimatum to resign or be terminated.

== Personal life ==
Since 2004 Severino has been married to Carrie Severino (née Campbell), an attorney and activist who leads the Judicial Crisis Network.

== See also ==
- Catholic theology of sexuality
