= Harlan Crow =

American-Kittitian real estate developer and conservative leader (born 1949)

- Born: Harlan Rogers Crow; 1949 (age 76–77); Dallas, Texas, U.S.
- Citizenship: U.S. Saint Kitts and Nevis (since 2012)
- Education: University of Texas at Austin (BBA)
- Occupation: Real estate developer
- Political party: Republican
- Spouses: Mollie Allen; Katherine Raymond
- Children: 3
- Father: Trammell Crow
- Relatives: Stuart Crow (brother)

Harlan Rogers Crow (born 1949) is an American-Kittitian real estate developer and conservative activist. He is the former chairman and CEO of the Trammell Crow Company, which was founded by his father, Trammell Crow. His father was described as the "largest landlord in the United States" by Forbes magazine.

Crow is the cofounder of Club for Growth and is a major donor to the Republican Party and American conservative causes. His relationship with Supreme Court of the United States Justice Clarence Thomas, which has lasted for over twenty years, has been the subject of significant news reporting since 2023 due to Thomas's not reporting (on financial disclosure forms) gifts and vacations Crow had provided to Thomas and his wife, Ginni Thomas.

== Early life and education ==
Harlan Crow was born in Dallas, the third son of Margaret Doggett Crow and real estate developer Trammell Crow. Margaret Crow survived the sinking of the SS Athenia, the first British ship sunk by Nazi Germany during World War II. He has four brothers and one sister. He attended high school at Randolph-Macon Academy in Front Royal, Virginia. He attended Emory University in Atlanta, Georgia, before transferring to the University of Texas at Austin, where he received a bachelor's degree in business administration.

== Career ==
Crow worked as a leasing agent for Trammell Crow Houston Industrial from 1974 to 1978 and managed the Dallas Office Building development operations of Trammell Crow Company from 1978 to 1986. He then served as President of the Wyndham Hotel Company from 1986 to 1988. He assumed responsibility for Crow Holdings in 1988, doing so during a downturn in the company's finances. Crow diversified the company and took on more property management business, revitalizing the company.

He currently serves as chairman of Crow Holdings and was formerly its chief executive officer.

== Political activities ==
Crow is a member of the founding committee of the Club for Growth and has served on the board of the American Enterprise Institute since 1996. He has donated almost $5 million to Republican campaigns and conservative groups.

Crow donated $500,000 toward publicity campaigns for President George W. Bush's nominees for the Supreme Court. In 2009, Crow mounted an unsuccessful multimillion-dollar campaign to block the establishment of a publicly owned convention hotel in Dallas. Politico reported, that same year, Crow had provided $500,000 in seed money to establish the Tea Party-affiliated Liberty Central, founded by Ginni Thomas, the wife of Justice Thomas. Crow declined to confirm or deny whether he was the donor in question, telling The New York Times, in February 2011, "I don't disclose what I'm not required to disclose."

The New Republic reported in 2023 that Crow has been a major donor to the political organization No Labels.

Harlan Crow has also donated to many Moderate and Conservative Democrats, including Josh Gottheimer, Henry Cuellar, Kyrsten Sinema, Joe Manchin, Jim Costa, Vicente Gonzalez, Jared Golden, Ed Case, Elissa Slotkin, Dean Phillips, Abigail Spanberger, Susie Lee, Lou Correa, Scott Peters, and Josh Harder.

== Personal life ==
Crow and his second wife, Kathy, have three children. Kathy Crow earned a bachelor's degree from Princeton University in 1989 and an MBA from the Cox School of Business at Southern Methodist University (SMU). She is a member of the SMU board of trustees and a member of the executive boards of the Cox School of Business and the Annette Caldwell Simmons School of Education and Human Development. In 2014, the Crows donated $5 million to build the Kathy Crow Commons at SMU.

Crow is a member of the all-male Bohemian Club, and as early as 1997 he had hosted Supreme Court Justice Clarence Thomas as a guest at the group's annual Bohemian Grove summer gathering, having met Thomas in the mid-1990s. Crow was also a friend and former business partner of the publisher Wick Allison.

The Intercept and Project on Government Oversight reported in 2023 that Crow and his family purchased citizenship in St. Kitts and Nevis through the citizenship-by-investment program in 2012, raising concerns about the billionaire's ability to shelter assets and obscure financial transactions by taking advantage of the island nation's banking secrecy laws.

=== Relationship with Clarence Thomas ===
In addition to providing initial funding for his wife Ginni Thomas's founding of Liberty Central in 2009; in 2023, ProPublica reported that Crow had given lavish gifts to Associate Supreme Court Justice Clarence Thomas over a period of 20 years. The gifts include a $19,000 Bible that belonged to Frederick Douglass. Crow gave Thomas a portrait of the justice and his wife, according to the painter, Sharif Tarabay. Tax filings show that Crow's foundation also gave $105,000 to the Yale Law School, Thomas's alma mater, for the "Justice Thomas Portrait Fund". Justice Thomas has accepted numerous week-long luxury trips, including island-hopping on Crow's superyacht, international and domestic private jet travel, and private resort stays.

On April 13, 2023, ProPublica reported that Crow had quietly paid Thomas for property occupied by Thomas's mother, despite law requiring disclosure of property sales by public officials. Crow said he bought the property with the intent of later turning the home into a public museum dedicated to Thomas. The property included two vacant lots. Soon after the purchase, an architecture firm received permits to begin $36,000 of improvements, while Thomas's mother continues to live there.

Allegations have risen that Crow has been "subsidizing the lifestyle of Thomas and his wife" as Thomas continued to support conservative causes on the Supreme Court.

Under rules that went into effect on March 14, 2023, justices must disclose many forms of gifts they receive; but exceptions exist if a gift of food, lodging, or entertainment is deemed "personal in nature" and the hospitality has been directly offered by an individual who has a personal relationship to the government official in question. The new rules do however require disclosure of stays at commercial properties as well as private jet travel.

Legal experts cited by ProPublica say that Thomas did not disclose the gifts, violating a financial disclosure law and ethical norms for judges. According to Crow, he has "never sought to influence Justice Thomas on any legal or political issue". Democratic lawmakers reacted to the revelations by demanding Thomas's resignation and calling for an investigation.

In a May 2023 letter Crow's lawyer said that the Senate Judiciary Committee, chaired by Dick Durbin, did not have "the authority to investigate Mr. Crow's personal friendship with Justice Thomas."

=== Art and memorabilia collections ===
Crow's Dallas residence has an extensive collection of historical artifacts, including communist and Nazi memorabilia. His residence houses two paintings by Adolf Hitler and a signed copy of Mein Kampf. Crow's backyard garden features what he named the 'Garden of Evil', which is home to at least 20 statues of authoritarian leaders and Communist icons including Vladimir Lenin, Joseph Stalin, Fidel Castro, Mao Zedong, Karl Marx, Hosni Mubarak, Josip Broz Tito, Nicolae Ceausescu, Walter Ulbricht, Gavrilo Princip, Bela Kun, and Che Guevara. Crow acquired these former public monuments after the collapse of the Soviet Union and the Eastern Bloc. According to Crow, he collects such memorabilia because he "hates communism and fascism". Crow also owns original paintings by Claude Monet, Rembrandt Peale, Pierre-Auguste Renoir, Winston Churchill, and Dwight D. Eisenhower.

Crow's private library contains a collection of 8,500 books and manuscripts including historical documents from Juan Ponce de León, Christopher Columbus, Amerigo Vespucci, George Washington, Robert E. Lee, and all the signers of the United States Declaration of Independence and the Constitution of the United States.

=== Private yacht ===
In 1984, Crow and his father formed a company, Rochelle Charter Inc., whose purpose was to lease out their new yacht, the Michaela Rose. In June 2023, Crow's attorney said that the yacht was used by Crow's friends, family, and employees. That does not meet the legal standard that for yacht leasing to be considered a for-profit business (and thus expenses to be deductible on tax returns): the yacht needed to be regularly chartered to third parties at fair market value.

In a February 2024 letter to Crow, Senate Finance Committee Chair Ron Wyden asked for justification for Crow's tax deductions, writing that “Any effort to mischaracterize a yacht used as a pleasure craft as a business is a run of the mill tax scam, plain and simple. Committee investigators determined that the yacht was not legally licensed to be chartered out for the transportation of passengers for hire in the United States.
