= Tripp Lite =

Electrical hardware manufacturer

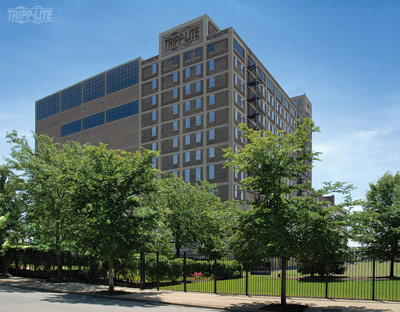
- Headquarters in Chicago, Illinois
- Type: Subsidiary
- Industry: Computer hardware, electrical equipment
- Founded: 1922
- Founder: Graham Trippe
- Headquarters: Chicago, Illinois, United States
- Key people: Barre Seid
- Products: UPS systems, PDUs, surge protectors, power inverters, electrical cables, racks
- Number of employees: > 450
- Parent: Eaton Corporation
- Website: https://tripplite.eaton.com

Tripp Lite is an American manufacturer of power protection and connecting electrical devices. It was founded in 1922 and is headquartered in Chicago, Illinois. The company employs more than 450 people and maintains a sales presence in over 80 countries worldwide. Tripp Lite manufactures a variety of product categories, including UPS systems, UPS replacement batteries, surge protectors, electrical cables and connectors, power inverters, KVM switches, power strips, PDUs, racks and rack cooling systems, power management software, laptop accessories, and audio/video equipment. Tripp Lite is ISO 9001 certified.

== History ==
Tripp Lite grew along with the cloud computing industry with their products widely used in data centers.

In 2020 Tripp Lite filed a lawsuit against the federal government over the first Trump tariffs on Chinese goods.

By April 2020, Tripp Lite executive Barre Seid had acquired a 100% stake in the company. Seid donated the company to the newly created nonprofit organization the Marble Freedom Trust. The Marble Freedom Trust is headed by Leonard Leo, a longtime leader of the Federalist Society and the primary architect of the movement to reshape the U.S. federal judiciary with conservative judges. In March 2021, the Marble Freedom Trust sold Tripp Lite to the Eaton Corporation for $1.65 billion, a transaction that resulted in significant tax savings.
