= David Harsanyi =

American journalist (born 1970 or 1971)

- Born: 1970 (age 55–56); New York City, U.S.
- Occupations: Writer, editor
- Employer: Washington Examiner
- Website: davidharsanyi.com

David Harsanyi (born 1970) is an American journalist, columnist, author, and editor. He is a senior writer at the Washington Examiner. In the past, he was a columnist at the Denver Post, one of the founding editors of The Federalist, and a senior writer at National Review. He is the author of six books.

== Personal life ==
Harsanyi was born in New York City in 1970. His parents were Jews who emigrated from Hungary to Rome in 1969, then to New York. His father had trained as a chemist in Hungary, but without English—language skills he found work in New York as a diamond setter. His mother took business courses and became an accountant. Harsanyi is the eldest of three brothers. He is a self-described atheist.

== Career ==
In his early career, Harsanyi worked as a sports-journalist, covering baseball for Sports Illustrated and the Associated Press. He has also written columns for "The Wall Street Journal, Reason, National Review, The Weekly Standard, The Christian Science Monitor, The Jerusalem Post, The Globe and Mail, The Hill", and he "worked for more than a decade as an editor, reporter and producer at media outlets such as the Associated Press, (and) the New York Daily News".

He was hired as a press secretary for the Republican Jewish Coalition prior to writing a column for eight years at The Denver Post. Harsanyi was hired by Blaze Media and then was a senior editor at the online publication, The Federalist, writing more than 800 columns. He became a senior writer at National Review in 2019. He left National Review in May 2022 to return to writing for The Federalist. In October 2024 he joined the Washington Examiner to write "In Focus" articles.

As of 2022, Harsanyi has appeared nine times on C-SPAN.

== Critical response ==
When Harsanyi began writing columns for The Denver Post, he was the subject of angry threats from readers. One reader threatened to take Harsanyi's head off and mount it on his wall. According to Michael Roberts of Westword, "Taxidermic threats are new for Harsanyi, whose pre-Post columns generally ran in publications that tilted to the right. 'When I was writing for the National Review, I had solely conservatives reading me,' he says, 'so I didn't get any nasty letters.' At the Post, however, he's been positively bombarded with negative missives during his first few weeks on the job, with many correspondents making sweeping generalizations about him based on perceptions of his politics." Roberts said, "Then again, Denver-area readers have had little recent experience with local columnists on the conservative side of the continuum."

Of Harsanyi's first book, The Nanny State, the Federalist Society said, "Harsanyi argues that when the government intervenes in this overzealous manner, no matter how good the intentions may appear to be, it not only diminishes our ability to make our own choices, but it promotes a culture of dependence that goes against the freedoms we celebrate so earnestly."

Publishers Weekly's review said "the book would have benefited from more anecdotes and original reporting, instead of incessantly naming overzealous do-gooders. Moreover, Harsanyi barely considers business's role, as these dangerous do-gooders fight fast food and tobacco companies armed with hundreds of millions of marketing dollars. There's not much new, but fellow libertarians may enjoy getting carried away by the flood of Harsanyi's outrage."

Jeff Minnick wrote of The People Have Spoken,

David Harsanyi offers a controversial thesis: our republic is dying, populism is its murderer, and the democracy replacing the republic will prove itself a dangerous dictator... The People Have Spoken is not a long book... I argued — and will continue to argue — with some of its premises, and I disliked the way the book ended, with no real solution, but Harsanyi's critique did cause me to reconsider the idea of democracy, which we have so eagerly tried to export into places like Iraq and Afghanistan..."

Of First Freedom: A Ride Through America's Enduring History with the Gun, Duke University's Michael C. Munger wrote, "It is not a legalistic argument about the importance of the Second Amendment, but rather a description of the place of guns in American history and culture."

According to David French, First Freedom "simultaneously serves as a technical, legal, and cultural history — an ambitious effort that could easily bog down in any given American period. But Harsanyi smartly balances detail and overview."

Introducing an interview with Harsanyi about First Freedom, Bob Zadek wrote, "Today there are more guns than people in the U.S. — by a lot — thanks in large part to progressives' efforts to restrict our Second Amendment rights... David Harsanyi relays these counter-intuitively findings in his new book".

The New York Times wrote that Harsanyi's opinions are among "differing perspectives worth your time".

== Selected publications ==
=== Books ===
- Harsanyi, David (September 18, 2007). Nanny State: How Food Fascists, Teetotaling Do-Gooders, Priggish Moralists, and other Boneheaded Bureaucrats are Turning America into a Nation of Children. Crown. ISBN 978-0-7679-2845-8.
- Harsanyi, David (March 4, 2013). Obama's Four Horsemen: The Disasters Unleashed by Obama's Reelection. Regnery Publishing. ISBN 978-1-62157-067-7.
- Harsanyi, David (March 10, 2014). The People Have Spoken (and They Are Wrong): The Case Against Democracy. Regnery Publishing. ISBN 978-1-62157-202-2.
- Harsanyi, David (October 2, 2018). First Freedom: A Ride Through America's Enduring History with the Gun. Simon and Schuster. ISBN 978-1-5011-7402-5.
- Harsanyi, David (October 26, 2021). Eurotrash: Why America Must Reject the Failed Ideas of a Dying Continent. Harper Collins. ISBN 978-0063066014.
- Harsanyi, David (November 19, 2024). The Rise of Blueanon: How the Democrats Became a Party of Conspiracy Theorists. Harper Collins. ISBN 978-0063360631.

=== Articles ===
- Harsanyi, David (April 15, 2021). "Fake News Is Real". National Review.
- Harsanyi, David (April 12, 2021). "This Just In: The Republican Party Is Dying — Again". National Review.
- Harsanyi, David (January 13, 2021). "All America Had to Do Was Not Be Crazy". National Review.

== See also ==
- Conservatism in the United States
- Libertarianism in the United States
- New Yorkers in journalism
- Partisan (politics)
