= Thomas Lindsay (academic) =

American academic

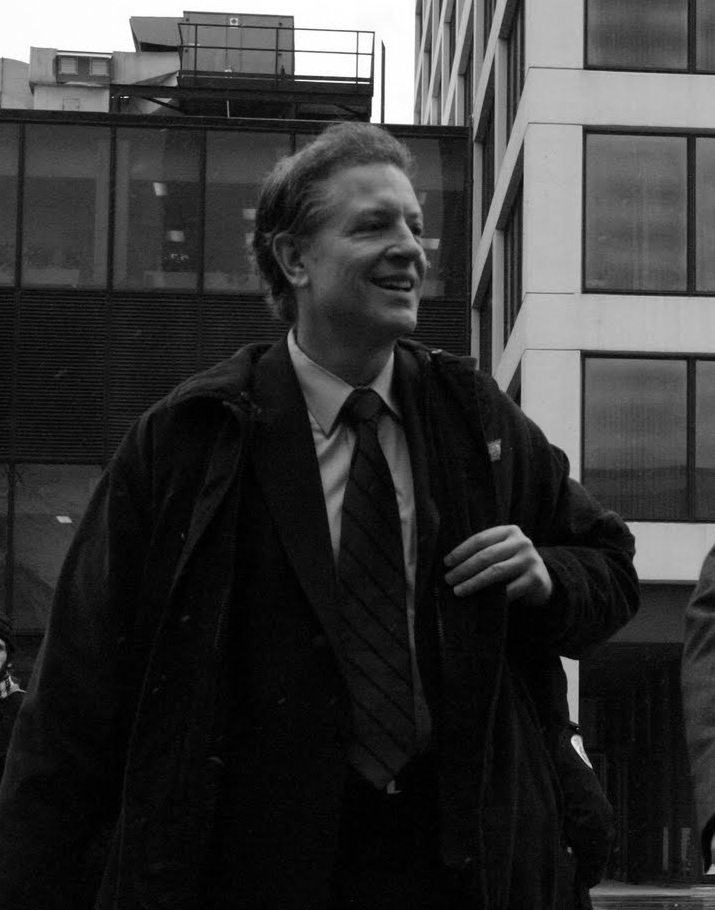
- Lindsay walking through protest of a Shimer College board meeting in 2010
- Born: Thomas Kevin Lindsay
- Title: President of Shimer College (2009–2010)

Scholarly background
- Education: BA Northern Illinois University, MA and PhD, University of Chicago
- Thesis: Aristotle on Democracy (1989)

Scholarly work
- Discipline: Political science
- School or tradition: American conservatism
- Institutions: University of Northern Iowa; University of Dallas; Seton Hall University; Shimer College

Thomas Kevin Lindsay is an American academic who briefly served as president of Shimer College. He was the Deputy Chairman of the National Endowment for the Humanities until December 2008. He was also the director of the NEH We the People initiative, which funds programs, research and other activities that explore significant events and themes in US history and culture, and advance knowledge of the principles that define America. He serves as the director of the Center for Higher Education at the Texas Public Policy Foundation, a conservative think tank.

== Early academic career ==
Lindsay received his Doctor of Philosophy degree from the University of Chicago. His research has focused largely on the relation of democracy and education. His articles have appeared in the American Political Science Review, The Journal of Politics, and the American Journal of Political Science.

Lindsay was a professor of political science at the University of Northern Iowa and won the Pi Sigma Alpha / American Political Science Association Award for Outstanding Teaching in 1999. The same year, he was appointed dean of the graduate school and director of the Institute for Philosophic Studies at the University of Dallas, and subsequently was promoted to provost.

In 2005, Lindsay briefly became provost and executive vice president of Seton Hall University.

== Shimer College presidency ==
Thomas Lindsay became president of Shimer College, a great books college with an enrollment of approximately 150 students, in January 2009. His short tenure was attributable to his controversial tactics and questionable long-term plans for the school. Controversy first broke out when Lindsay abruptly fired the director of admissions, subsequently replacing her with a candidate who had been twice rejected by the search committee. According to Shimer Professor Albert Fernandez, Lindsay's actions were undertaken unilaterally, "without any internal consultation whatsoever". He soon acquired the title, "The Enemy of Democracy at Shimer College" as reported in the Student Newspaper of the Illinois Institute of Technology (Shimer had relocated to the IIT Campus in 2006).

In January 2010, it was first made public that most of the trustees supporting Lindsay's actions also shared financial ties with Barre Seid. Seid, a conservative Chicago industrialist and noted supporter of right wing causes, had previously made major donations to Shimer, albeit anonymously. In February 2010, despite the unanimous objections of the faculty, strong opposition from the community as a whole, and protests by students, the Board of Trustees approved a wholesale rewrite by Lindsay of the school's mission statement. The vote passed by a secret ballot vote of 18–16. In response, on April 14, the Shimer Assembly passed a vote of no confidence.

Four days later, on April 18, 2010, the Shimer College Board of Trustees voted to remove Lindsay from his post as president. A majority voted to oust Lindsay, leaving a small contingent of Lindsay supporters on the board, all of whom subsequently resigned. The vote came shortly after unanimous votes of no confidence by the faculty, the Alumni Association, and the Assembly.

== Later academic career ==
In September 2011, Lindsay joined the Texas Public Policy Foundation, a conservative think tank based in Austin, Texas, where he serves as the director of the Center for Higher Education.

== Publications ==
- "The Future of Texas A&M is in Danger". June, 2012
- "Texas' $10,000 Degree ". April, 2012
- "Higher Education Needs Help From Everyone". April, 2012
- "Higher Education's Cost and Value: A Tale of North and South ". November, 2011
- "Aristotle's Appraisal of Manly Spirit: Political and Philosophic Implications," American Journal of Political Science, 44 (July 2000): pp. 433–448.
- "Democracy, Acquisitiveness, and the Private Realm," Political Science Reviewer, 28 (1999):pp. 48–74.
- "Defending Liberalism?" University of Iowa Law Review, 1997, Vol. 82, No. 3, pp. 943–964.
- "Unlearning Liberty," Academic Questions, Summer 1997, Vol. 10, No. 3, pp. 55–62.
- "Antiquing America," monograph-length essay (23,000 words), Interpretation: A Journal of Political Philosophy, Winter 1996, Vol. 23, No. 2, pp. 249–295.
- "Was Aristotle Racist, Sexist, and Anti-Democratic?" The Review of Politics 56:1 (Winter 1994): 127–151.
- "Religion and the Founder's Intentions," in The American Experiment: Essays on the Theory and Practice of Liberty, ed. Peter Lawler and Robert Schaefer. Savage, MD: Rowman & Littlefield, 1994, pp. 119–134.
- "Liberty, Equality, Power," The American Journal of Political Science 36:3 (August 1992): 743–761.
- "Aristotle's Qualified Defense of Democracy Through 'Political Mixing,'" The Journal of Politics 54:1 (February 1992): 101–119.
- "James Madison on Religion and Politics: Rhetoric and Reality," American Political Science Review 85:4 (December 1991): 1321–1337.
- "The 'God-Like Man' versus the 'Best Laws': Politics and Religion in Aristotle's Politics," The Review of Politics 53:3 (Summer 1991): 488–509.
- "Reform, Old and New," Research in Urban Policy 2 (1986): 209–215.

== Other published writings ==
- "Becoming American" Inside Higher Ed (April 2008): pp. 115–117.
- "(Post)Modern Romance^{[unfit]}" The Heritage Lectures, No. 463, June 1993.
- "Western Civilization," The American Interest (May/June, 2008): 20–24.
