= Liberty Central =

Defunct U.S. political advocacy organization

- Formation: 2009
- Dissolved: 2012
- Legal status: 501(c)(4)
- Headquarters: Washington, DC
- Region served: United States
- President and CEO: Ginni Thomas

Liberty Central was a non-profit conservative political advocacy group founded in 2009 by Ginni Thomas, wife of U.S. Supreme Court Associate Justice Clarence Thomas, with Leonard Leo listed as a director and $500,000 financing from Harlan Crow. Virginia Thomas was formally listed as president and CEO. The group ceased operations in 2012.

== Mission ==
Its declared purpose was stated on its website as "America's Public Square. We Listen. We Inspire. We Activate ... to secure the blessings of liberty." The organization was promoted at the 2010 Conservative Political Action Conference as "an online community for those seeking to "preserve freedom and reaffirm the core founding principles." Ed Morrissey, a prominent conservative blogger who runs Hotair.com, said the Liberty Central site would provide education in history and the Constitution for tea party activists.

== Funding ==
The group was founded with seed money of $550,000 coming from two donors whose names were undisclosed. In a February 2011 article, Politico reported that the initial $500,000 contribution came from Dallas real estate investor and conservative philanthropist Harlan Crow.

== Activities ==
Liberty Central activities have included hosting a live web cast on October 20, 2010, in conjunction with the Family Research Council to protest the January 2011 expiration of tax cuts that were passed in 2001 and 2003.

According to United Press International, the Liberty Central group has been highly critical of U.S. President Barack Obama.

== Criticism ==
Thomas has been criticized for her involvement in Liberty Central because someone who contributes to the group may have a case before the Supreme Court. However, there is no law limiting what Thomas can do, and according to some legal experts Supreme Court Justices are not required to recuse themselves from cases where they may have a conflict of interest.

On October 21, 2010, Thomas was specifically criticized for taking a position, via Liberty Central, on an issue that was likely to come before the Supreme Court - whether the 2010 health care legislation was unconstitutional. A memo signed by Thomas that called for the repeal of the law and that was posted on the Liberty Central website was removed following the criticism. A Liberty Central spokesperson explained that Thomas had not personally reviewed the memo and that it been mistakenly approved by a staff member, and had been circulated by another group, the Conservative Action Project.
