= The Federalist (website) =

American conservative online magazine and podcast

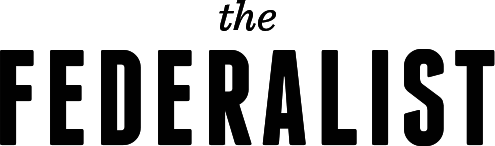
- Website type: Online magazine
- Available in: English
- Headquarters: United States
- Founders: Ben Domenech; Sean Davis
- Editors: David Harsanyi; Mollie Hemingway
- Website: thefederalist.com
- Commercial: Yes
- Registration: Optional
- Launched: September 1, 2013; 13 years ago
- Current status: Active

The Federalist is an American conservative online magazine and podcast that covers politics, policy, culture, and religion, and publishes a newsletter. The site was co-founded by Ben Domenech and Sean Davis and launched in September 2013.

During the COVID-19 pandemic, The Federalist published many pieces that contained false information, pseudoscience, and contradictions or misrepresentations of the recommendations of public health authorities. The Federalist made false claims that there had been large-scale election fraud during the counting of ballots in the 2020 United States presidential election.

== History ==
The Federalist was co-founded by Ben Domenech and Sean Davis; senior editors include David Harsanyi and Mollie Hemingway. Domenech wrote that The Federalist was inspired by the mission and worldview of the original Time magazine's editor, Henry Luce, which he described as, "[leaning] to the political right, with a small-c conservatism equipped with a populist respect for the middle class reader outside of New York and Washington, and an abiding love for America at a time when snark and cynicism were not considered substitutes for smart analysis." Quoted in The Washington Post in 2018, Domenech described The Federalist as having no office and a staff that was "majority female, half millennial, and a quarter minority."

=== Finances ===
The Federalist has not disclosed its funding sources and critics have asked who is funding the site, since ad revenue alone would not be enough for the publication to sustain its staff of 14. Two sources with knowledge of the publication's finances said that one of the major backers of The Federalist is Dick Uihlein, a packing supply magnate and Trump donor who has a history of supporting far-right political candidates.

According to BuzzFeed News, the website's funding prompted "a considerable amount of speculation in the political media world, with the phrase 'Who funds the Federalist?' becoming a recurring meme." In response, the website once sold an "I Fund the Federalist" T-shirt to supporters.

In 2020, The Federalist received at least $200,000 in COVID-19 relief funds from the Paycheck Protection Program.

The site's parent company receives underwriting from the Conservative Partnership Institute, a "nerve center" of the American right-wing that serves as an incubator for Donald Trump loyalists to develop strategies.

=== Neil deGrasse Tyson ===
In late 2014, The Federalist published an article alleging that Neil deGrasse Tyson had used "misstated" quotes in his public presentations, including one attributed to George W. Bush. Tyson later cited the Bush quote to a speech given after the Space Shuttle Columbia disaster, and apologized to Bush for misremembering the date and context.

=== Roy Moore ===
In November 2017, The Federalist came under criticism from both conservatives and liberals for publishing an opinion piece by Tully Borland, Ouachita Baptist University philosopher, defending Roy Moore for allegedly dating teenagers while he was in his 30s, and arguing that such behavior was "not without some merit if one wants to raise a large family". Noah Rothman of the conservative Commentary magazine stated that the op-ed was "rationalizing away child molestation". Molly Roberts of The Washington Post wrote that the op-ed was "uniquely awful". Domenech defended The Federalist for publishing Borland's op-ed, saying the magazine "remains avowedly committed to offering alternative views. For those that have a problem with this, the question is simple: what are you afraid of?"

=== "Black crime" tag ===
Until October 2017, The Federalist had a "black crime" tag, which aggregated articles related to criminal activity by African Americans. Dan McLaughlin of National Review, a former Federalist contributor, said that the phrasing of the "black crime" tag was "unfortunate." Adding that when he had written for The Federalist, he had "never even noticed that there were tags at the bottom of my essays," and that The Federalist "had deleted the tag as soon as it attracted any notice—over a couple of years the tag appeared on only five or six posts."

=== Andrew McCabe ===
In May 2018, The Federalist published an article which suggested that former FBI deputy director Andrew McCabe had leaked a story to the news channel CNN. The article presented no evidence that this was the case, only that McCabe was aware that CNN would publish a story four days prior to its eventual publication. McCabe had been fired from the FBI in 2018 following a Justice Department Inspector General's report that found he "lacked candor" and acted improperly. According to Matt Ford in The New Republic, the more likely explanation was that CNN contacted the FBI Press Office, consistent with journalistic practices, for comment on a forthcoming story. George W. Bush's former press secretary Ari Fleischer agreed that CNN was likely contacting the FBI for comment on a forthcoming story, and said that "Whoever told CNN about the briefing is the problem." The Federalist story was widely disseminated, including a tweet from Donald Trump Jr.

=== COVID-19 pandemic misinformation ===
During the COVID-19 pandemic, The Federalist published numerous pieces that contained false information or information that was contrary to the recommendations of public health experts and authorities. The Federalist published articles denouncing social distancing, as well as articles claiming that fears over the pandemic had been overhyped by the Democratic Party and the media. The Federalist co-founder Sean Davis said that Democrats were intentionally trying to "destroy the economy" as a "last-ditch 2020 play", and that "All they care about is power. And if they have to destroy your life and business to get power back, they will." According to Media Matters for America, The Federalist published articles calling on the government to quickly end social distancing directions, and to open businesses again. Co-founder Domenech attacked a prominent analysis from Imperial College London which estimated the loss of life due to the pandemic. Domenech attacked the analysis for revising its figures downward, but the reason that the analysis did so was that the analysis incorporated the social distancing and shutdown strategies that had increasingly been implemented. Robert Tracinski, a former contributor, wrote in The Bulwark that The Federalist had devolved over time into a "conspiracy-mongering partisan rag that has now become a menace to public health".

It published a piece by a Medical Doctor in Oregon who recommended that people hold chickenpox-style parties for the coronavirus to build herd immunity, but the recommendations were contrary to those of public health experts, and the author in question did not have an active medical license and had worked as a businessman for decades. At the time, experts warned that the number of new infections should be kept down so as to not overburden the health care system. The Federalist was subsequently temporarily suspended from Twitter for promoting fringe ideas that contradicted public health experts and were harmful to public health. Reddit also removed links to The Federalist article on its platform.

The Federalist has published articles opposing COVID-19 vaccine mandates and articles suggesting that pregnant women should not receive COVID-19 vaccines.

=== Allegations of labor law violation ===
In 2019, following staff of other American media companies unionizing, co-founder Domenech tweeted "first one of you tries to unionize I swear I'll send you back to the salt mine". In 2020, an NLRB judge ruled that Domenech had threatened staff illegally and required the company to post notices in its offices and email employees to inform them about their legal rights. Domenech argued unsuccessfully that the tweet was a joke. The New Civil Liberties Alliance, a nonprofit dedicated to fighting what it says is an excessive administrative state, and which had been representing The Federalist pro bono, announced that they would appeal. Reason and National Review published articles questioning the judge's decision. In November 2020 a NLRB panel endorsed the ruling and additionally ordered the company to instruct Domenech to delete the tweet. A U.S. court of appeals found the NLRB's action "unlawful", and vacated the NLRB's orders because the tweet was not an unlawful labor practice and because the tweet was protected First Amendment speech.

=== Google Ads ===
In June 2020, Google Ads warned The Federalist that it was considering demonetizing the website because of racism in its comment section. The Federalist removed the comment section entirely, and Google announced that "no action will be taken". In response, Domenech said: "We are really learning the degree to which Big Tech can be weaponized by woke mobs, or woke journalists in this case, to try to shut down places who disagree with their leftist agenda." Tech journalist Mike Masnick called these accusations baseless, pointing out that many different websites were routinely receiving such notices from Google (quoting nine recent examples from his own news site, Techdirt): "It's not anti-conservative bias, but just yet another example of how difficult it is to do any form of content moderation at scale".

=== Falsehoods during the 2020 election ===
While ballots were being counted in the 2020 election, The Federalist made false claims of large-scale fraud. One of The Federalist's tweets said, "Yes, Democrats Are Trying To Steal The Election In Michigan, Wisconsin, And Pennsylvania." The website falsely insinuated that fraud was occurring in Michigan. While other news outlets quickly showed that the purported fraud was a clerical error that was quickly corrected; The Federalist did not delete the story, which had gone viral. Co-founder Sean Davis shared the misleading story, leading Twitter to tag his post as containing disputed information.

Republican congressman Cliff Bentz of Oregon referenced Federalist articles as the source of his allegation during a town hall in La Grande that Facebook founder Mark Zuckerberg "bought" the 2020 election for Joe Biden by financing a 503(c)(3) non-profit to expand poll worker training and security.

== Reception ==
According to The New York Times, The Federalist "leans hard into the culture wars", with pieces that question the Me Too movement and characterize recognition of transgender identity as a "war on women".

Writing for Politico in 2014, Reid Cherlin wrote about The Federalist in an article about the rise in right-wing media online, describing the site as "seek[ing] to go deep on the issues and sway the conversation in Washington." Matt K. Lewis wrote in The Week that conservative online media was divided between "staid, august publications" and "a new generation of irreverent sites," and that "sites like The Federalist try to bridge the gap by providing serious commentary that is typically written by young, pop culture–savvy writers." In May 2018, Damon Linker of The Week described The Federalist as "a leading disseminator of pro-Trump conspiracies and up-is-down, funhouse-mirror distortions of Special Counsel Robert Mueller's investigation into Russian election meddling and potential Trump involvement."

David Weigel from Bloomberg Politics stated that The Federalist frequently criticizes left-leaning publications, but was founded with the intention of being "a source of original interviews and real-time arguments between conservatives and libertarians." During the 2016 US presidential election, conservative pundit and Trump-critic Matt K. Lewis, writing for The Daily Beast, believed there had been a shift in The Federalist's coverage of Donald Trump, first criticizing the presidential candidate, and then, after Trump won the presidency, criticizing Trump's liberal critics in the mainstream establishment media and casting Trump as a victim. In 2020, former employee Robert Tracinski particularly blamed the publication's reputation for inaccuracy on co-founder Davis, who he said had a destructive "always be trolling" mindset.
