= The Case Against Barack Obama =

2008 book by David Freddoso

- Author: David Freddoso
- Language: English
- Subject: Biographical / Current affairs
- Publisher: Regnery Publishing
- Publication date: August 4, 2008
- Publication place: United States
- Media type: Print (Hardcover)
- Pages: 298
- ISBN: 978-1-59698-566-7
- OCLC: 231580337
- Dewey Decimal: 973.932092 B 22
- LC Class: E901.1.O23 F74 2008

The Case Against Barack Obama: The Unlikely Rise and Unexamined Agenda of the Media's Favorite Candidate, by author David Freddoso, is an American non-fiction book published in late 2008, providing a critical examination of the life and opinions of the then United States presidential candidate and Senator Barack Obama.

Freddoso was a political reporter for the website of the conservative magazine National Review when the book came out. He is now with the Washington Examiner. The book was published by Regnery Publishing.

Freddoso said in an August 2008 interview that the book is an attempt to address what he sees as two wrong ways of considering Obama as a presidential candidate. The author wanted to counter those, including those in the news media, who look on Obama uncritically, and to do so in a way different from those who "are smearing him on the Internet for supposedly being a secret Muslim or supposedly not saluting the flag". The book harshly criticizes Obama over policy matters, according to Ben Smith, a writer at Politico. For the most part, the book is drawn from published sources, although Freddoso does some original reporting.

The first press run of the book was nearly 300,000 copies, and it appeared on the August 24, 2008 New York Times Bestseller List for hardcover nonfiction at No. 5. Publicity for the book is handled by the conservative public relations firm Creative Response Concepts.

The book was released within weeks of two other books critical of Obama written by conservative writers: Jerome Corsi’s The Obama Nation: Leftist Politics and the Cult of Personality, and Dick Morris’ Fleeced: How Barack Obama, Media Mockery of Terrorist Threats, Liberals Who Want to Kill Talk Radio, the Do-Nothing Congress, Companies That Help Iran, and Washington Lobbyists for Foreign Governments Are Scamming Us ... and What to Do About It.

== Content ==
Obama's political positions are reviewed in the book. "If you’re a liberal, reading the following might make you support Obama even more," Freddoso states at one point in the book. "But if you’re honest, I think you’ll agree he’s no centrist."

The book discusses Obama's alleged "radical associations" with such controversial people as Bill Ayers, a former Weatherman organization leader, and Obama's former pastor, the Rev. Jeremiah Wright.

Part of the book focuses on Obama's having made accommodations with the Cook County Democratic Party, despite Obama's start in politics as a candidate appealing to reform-minded voters in the Hyde Park neighborhood of the city.

The book dwells at length on Obama's opposition to an Illinois bill that sought to protect infants “born alive,” but whose critics said it could have fundamentally undermined the right to abortion. A similar bill passed the United States Congress only after an explicit commitment to Roe v. Wade was added, which Freddoso dismisses as trivial, but which abortion rights advocates saw as crucial.

== Response ==
=== Barack Obama presidential campaign ===
A spokesman for Barack Obama's presidential campaign said the book, along with Jerome Corsi's biography, distorts the story of the candidate's life and his record. "These books are cut from the same cloth, made up of the same old debunked smears that have been floating around the Internet for months," said spokesman Tommy Vietor.

On September 15, 2008, the Obama campaign mobilized its “Obama Action Wire” sending an email out to Obama supporters urging them to complain to WGN Radio in Chicago after host Milt Rosenberg invited Freddoso on his show to discuss his book.

=== Reviews ===
Ben Smith, a writer at Politico, called the book the "first serious negative biography of Senator Barack Obama". The book's official release date was August 4, 2008. According to Smith, the book "occupies a small island in the often-shrill sea of criticism of Obama [...] Freddoso opts largely for a fact-based critique, and writes that the viral and overt smears have allowed Obama to evade substantive criticism." Smith wrote that the book "rehashes familiar complaints, though in more detail — and often with more nuance, if not much sympathy — than you’re likely to see in the conservative media."

Jim Geraghty, a writer for National Review and National Review Online, wrote in his review of the book that "Freddoso hones in on one aspect of the Obama message, the idea that Obama is a reformer, and obliterates it in the manner of a professional demolitions crew." Geraghty also compared the book to Jerome Corsi's The Obama Nation. "If Obama falls short of his presidential aspiration, his supporters will be quick to attribute it to 'false smears' in Corsi’s book," Geraghty predicted. "But any Obama defeat is more likely to be a result of the hard truths in Freddoso’s." Geraghty notes that David Freddoso thanks him in the book's acknowledgments section.

=== Alleged inaccuracies ===
According to an Associated Press report, Freddoso's book "sometimes includes inaccurate or incomplete information" to back the argument that Obama's record should be opposed by conservatives and moderates. The report states that "Freddoso accuses Obama of voting to raise taxes on anyone with taxable income of more than $32,500." The nonpartisan watchdog group Factcheck.org (itself funded primarily by the Annenberg Foundation), notes that provision was part of a nonbinding budget resolution that had no actual impact on tax levels, and that Obama's tax proposals do not include any such increase." According to Factcheck.org: "...Obama's March 2008 vote for a non-binding budget resolution that would have set general revenue and spending targets for congressional tax-writing and appropriations committees. The resolution does not contain a specific provision to raise tax rates, but rather assumes that most of the 2001 and 2003 tax cuts expire as scheduled in 2011. It also bears no relation to Obama's proposed economic plan" and also "In particular, the (budget) resolution would allow the 25 percent tax bracket to return to its pre-2001 level of 28 percent. That bracket kicks in at $32,550 for an individual or $65,100 for a married couple."

== Writing, publishing and publicizing the book ==
Freddoso took a leave from his job with National Review Online to write the book. The author had been a writer for Human Events and a political reporter for Robert Novak's Evans-Novak Political Report.

The first press run of the book totaled nearly 300,000 copies, and it appeared on the August 24, 2008 New York Times Bestseller List for hardcover nonfiction at No. 5 (the list reflected sales for the week ending August 9, 2008; the Times stated that some book stores reported receiving bulk orders). Publicity for the book is handled by the conservative public relations firm Creative Response Concepts, headed by former Republican political official Greg Mueller. Creative Response Concepts also organized publicity for Unfit for Command by John O'Neill and Jerome Corsi, and for the 527 group Swift Boat Veterans for Truth during the 2004 United States presidential election.
