= The 85 Fund =

501(c)(3) organization based in Washington D.C.

- Formation: 2011; 15 years ago
- Type: 501(c)(3) organization
- Tax ID no.: 20-2466871
- Headquarters: Washington, D.C., U.S.
- Region served: United States
- Key people: Leonard Leo
- Affiliations: Concord Fund; CRC Advisors
- Formerly called: Judicial Education Project

The 85 Fund, also known as the Honest Elections Project, and formerly known as the Judicial Education Project, is a 501(c)(3) organization based in Washington D.C. It is among a network of conservative organizations associated with Leonard Leo, a longtime prominent figure in the Federalist Society, that are funded mostly by anonymous donors. The 85 Fund had revenue of over $65 million in 2020 and, with the Concord Fund, acts as a funding hub for other organizations in the Leo network.

As the Honest Elections Project, it participated in lawsuits during the 2020 United States presidential election and ran advertisements against mail-in voting. It is a proponent of the independent state legislature theory that posits state legislatures have sole authority to establish and enforce state election laws and rules. Leo has said that the fund-raising prowess of Arabella Advisors, a liberal consulting firm, was an inspiration for the 85 Fund to serve a similar function on the right.

== Organization and finances ==
The secretary of The 85 Fund is Carrie Severino, who is the president of the Concord Fund. Both funds are closely connected to Leonard Leo, the chairman of CRC Advisors and former vice president of the Federalist Society. The group's 2017 tax return listed a payment of $675,000 to the BH Group, an employer of Leo. Neil Corkery formerly served as president of the group.

Between 2012 and 2017, the group raised $46 million. In 2018, more than 99% of the group's funding came from a single $7.8 million donation from Donors Trust, a donor-advised fund. In 2020, The 85 Fund received $20 million in donations from Donors Trust.

Leo is a powerful figure in fund-raising and expertise for the American conservative movement. He has said that the 85 Fund was inspired by the fund-raising of Arabella Advisors, a liberal consulting firm that advises donors.

Politico reported in August 2023 that Attorney General for the District of Columbia Brian Schwalb was investigating Leo and his network of nonprofit groups. Schwalb's office did not confirm or deny the existence of a probe.

== Expenditures ==
The group donated $300,000 to the Independent Women's Forum, a conservative nonprofit organization.

In 2011 and 2012, Leonard Leo arranged for Liberty Consulting, a firm owned by Ginni Thomas, wife of Supreme Court justice Clarence Thomas, to be paid $80,000 by Kellyanne Conway and her firm The Polling Company, billed to the Judicial Education Project. Leo directed Conway not to mention Ginni Thomas in the paperwork. Leo told The Washington Post, "As an advisor to JEP I have long been supportive of its opinion research relating to limited government, and The Polling Company, along with Ginni Thomas's help, has been an invaluable resource for gauging public attitudes." He also said "Knowing how disrespectful, malicious and gossipy people can be, I have always tried to protect the privacy of Justice Thomas and Ginni."

In 2020, The 85 Fund provided $750,000 in funding to the Mercatus Center, a think tank affiliated with George Mason University.

In 2020, The 85 Fund donated $1 million to the Accountability and Civics Trust Project, formerly run by Matthew Whitaker. The Accountability and Civics Trust Project filed a complaint to the Office of Special Council to investigate Jennifer Granholm, the then current United States Secretary of Energy.

In 2020, The 85 Fund donated $2 million to the Government Accountability Institute, a group founded by former White House strategist Steve Bannon and investigator Peter Schweizer and chaired by Rebekah Mercer.

In September 2024, Leo wrote to recipients of 85 Fund grants to say that he was conducting a "comprehensive review" to determine whether recipients are being assertive enough to "operationalize or weaponize the conservative vision" to "crush liberal dominance at the choke points of influence and power in our society."

== Honest Elections Project ==
In April 2020, the Honest Elections Project (HEP) announced it was launching a week-long $250,000 digital and television ad campaign on Fox News, MSNBC, and CNN against mail-in voting.

Lawyers contracted by HEP sent letters to the secretaries of state in Colorado, Florida, and Michigan to lobby for purges of voter rolls in these states. The Guardian reported that these letters used "misleading data to accuse jurisdictions of having bloated voter rolls" and threatened legal action. HEP filed legal briefs in favor of voting restrictions in Nevada, Virginia, Texas, and Minnesota.

In 2020, The 85 Fund provided $70,000 in funding to HEP.

In September 2020, HEP was involved in legal action concerning whether mail-in ballots that were postmarked before the election but arrived up to 14 days after it should be counted; the suit was successful.

HEP concluded that there was no widespread fraud in the 2020 United States presidential election and did not participate in any litigation to try to challenge or overturn the election results. HEP issued a statement criticizing the 2021 United States Capitol attack that occurred on January 6, saying: "The violent insurrection at the Capitol was a heinous attack against democracy, the rule of law, and the election system HEP was created to defend."

In May 2021, HEP lobbied against H.R. 1, also known as the For the People Act. As of 2021, the executive director of HEP was Jason Snead.

HEP is a proponent of the independent state legislature theory that posits state legislatures have sole authority to establish and enforce state election laws and rules, without judicial or executive review. It has argued the doctrine in amicus briefs to the United States Supreme Court, which in June 2022 decided to hear a case brought by North Carolina Republicans during its next session beginning in October 2022. Critics of the doctrine said it might allow state legislatures controlled by one party, commonly made possible through gerrymandering, to decide the outcome of federal elections against the will of the majority of voters.

HEP has been described as an alias of the Judicial Education Project and the 85 Fund.

HEP has led advocacy efforts against ranked choice voting.

HEP is a member of the advisory board of Project 2025, a collection of conservative and right-wing policy proposals from the Heritage Foundation to reshape the United States federal government and consolidate executive power should the Republican nominee win the 2024 presidential election.

== See also ==
- Donors Capital Fund
- Donors Trust
