= CRC Advisors =

American public relations firm

CRC Advisors (CRC) (formerly known as Creative Response Concepts Public Relations) is an American public relations firm. Formed in 2020, Leonard Leo is its chairman.

In 2018, Politico wrote that Creative Response Concepts Public Relations was best known for its work with the Swift Vets and POWs for Truth in the 2004 presidential election. Politico said the company "has long been the go-to communications firm for conservative organizations in Washington and across the country."

Clients of the company have included the Federalist Society, the Concord Fund, and Chevron Corporation.

== History ==
Creative Response Concepts Public Relations was founded in 1989 by Leif E. Noren, a former executive director of the National Conservative Political Action Committee. Its longtime president was Greg Mueller, who in 2020 founded an affiliated firm CRC Advisors with Leonard Leo. By 2022, that organization was compensated $18 million by The 85 Fund and the Concord Fund, which fund Leo's network. Mueller was the communications director for the unsuccessful presidential campaigns of Pat Buchanan in 1992 and 1996.

In 1994, CRC was hired by Newt Gingrich's Contract with America effort.

CRC was hired by the Discovery Institute during the Kitzmiller v. Dover Area School District trial over teaching intelligent design in public schools.

In 2006, CRC was retained to help promote the 2006 film World Trade Center directed by Oliver Stone.

The company was hired to promote The Case Against Barack Obama, a 2008 book written by David Freddoso and published by Regnery Publishing.

CRC advocated on behalf of Supreme Court justice nominee Neil Gorsuch. In 2018, CRC was involved in pushing unsubstantiated allegations made by activist Edward Whelan that the sexual assault accuser of Supreme Court justice nominee Brett Kavanaugh had confused Kavanaugh with someone who allegedly looked like Kavanaugh.

In 2018, CRC's clients included the Federalist Society and the Judicial Crisis Network. In 2019, CRC helped promote conservative pundit Stephen Moore's nomination to serve on the Federal Reserve Board.

CRC Advisors has lobbied against climate change mitigation policies.

In 2021, CRC represented the Media Research Center.

In 2024, The Guardian reported that CRC has represented Consumers' Research, a conservative advocacy group.

== See also ==
- John Kerry military service controversy
