= Edward Whelan (American lawyer) =

American blogger and activist (born 1960)

Ed Whelan
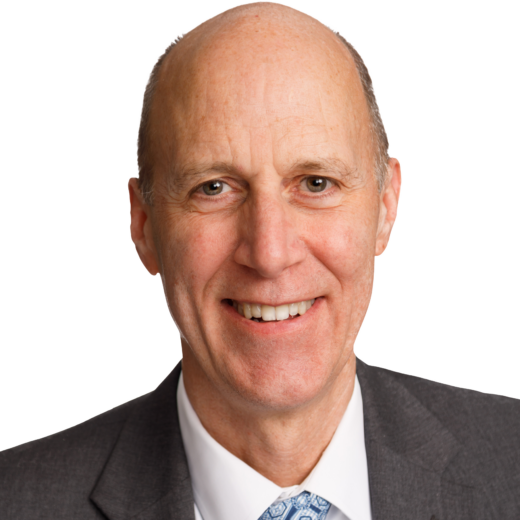
- Whelan in 2025
- Born: Martin Edward Whelan III; July 26, 1960 (age 65); Los Angeles, California, US
- Education: Harvard University (BA, JD)
- Occupations: Vice President of the Ethics and Public Policy Center; Blogger for National Review
- Children: 4

Martin Edward Whelan III (born July 26, 1960) is an American lawyer, legal activist and political commentator. Whelan's legal career included clerking for Supreme Court Justice Antonin Scalia and serving as a deputy assistant attorney general during the George W. Bush administration. From 2004 to 2021, he served as the president of the Ethics and Public Policy Center, a conservative think tank "dedicated to applying the Judeo-Christian moral tradition to critical issues of public policy".

== Early life and education ==
Whelan was born in Los Angeles, California, to attorney Martin Edward Whelan II and Nancy Carolyn Mispagel. Whelan is a 1978 graduate of Servite High School. Whelan graduated with honors from Harvard University in 1981 and was inducted into Phi Beta Kappa. In 1985, he earned a J.D. degree, magna cum laude, from Harvard Law School, where he was an editor of the Harvard Law Review.

== Career ==
From 1985 until 1986, Whelan worked as a law clerk to United States Court of Appeals for the Ninth Circuit Judge J. Clifford Wallace. From 1991 until 1992, Whelan worked as a law clerk to United States Supreme Court Associate Justice Antonin Scalia. His co-clerks included future judges Jeffrey Sutton and Daniel P. Collins.

In the 1990s, Whelan served as general counsel to the United States Senate Committee on the Judiciary while it was controlled by Republicans. He also has worked as a lawyer in private practice and was Senior Vice President and Counselor to the General Counsel for Verizon Corporation.

From 2001 until 2004, Whelan served as Principal Deputy Assistant Attorney General for the United States Department of Justice's Office of Legal Counsel, advising the White House Counsel's Office, the Attorney General and other senior DOJ officials, and Departments and agencies throughout the executive branch on difficult and sensitive legal questions.

In 2004, Whelan became president of the Ethics and Public Policy Center, a conservative nonprofit think tank that is based in Washington, D.C. He directs the EPPC's program on the United States Constitution, federal courts and culture.

In 2016, Whelan gave his opinion in an interview reported by The New York Times. Whelan asked conservatives to adopt an uncompromising stance on appointments to the upper ranks of the U.S. judiciary, including appeals courts (which give the last word on cases the U.S. Supreme Court declines to review, and which can serve as a "breeding ground" for future Supreme Court justices).

== Kavanaugh nomination ==
In 2018, Whelan helped advise his close friend Brett Kavanaugh, a federal judge, in the latter's nomination effort to be an Associate Justice of the Supreme Court of the United States. On September 16, Christine Blasey Ford, a professor at Palo Alto University in California, accused Kavanaugh of sexually assaulting and attempting to rape her in the early 1980s when they were teenagers.

Whelan drew considerable criticism when he attempted to defend Kavanaugh, then involved in contentious hearings following his nomination to the Supreme Court. With assistance and information supplied from Creative Response Concepts Public Relations, a conservative public relations firm, Whelan tweeted that Blasey Ford's allegation against Kavanaugh may have been a case of mistaken identity. Whelan went so far as to claim that the real sexual assailant was a Georgetown Prep classmate of Kavanaugh's who he indicated closely resembled him. He also shared the classmate's address and room layout of the man's childhood home, photographs of him, and his full name.

After facing strong criticism for what critics called a baseless smear of a private citizen, he apologized a day later for an "appalling and inexcusable mistake of judgment."

== Books ==
Whelan is the co-editor of three volumes of Justice Antonin Scalia's work: Scalia Speaks: Reflections on Law, Faith, and Life Well Lived, a New York Times-bestselling collection of speeches by Justice Scalia; On Faith: Lessons From an American Believer, a collection of Justice Scalia's writings on faith and religion; and The Essential Scalia: On the Constitution, the Courts, and the Rule of Law, a collection that highlights Justice Scalia's jurisprudence.

The works have been critically acclaimed. Each has featured a foreword from one of Scalia's former colleagues on the Supreme Court, including Justice Ruth Bader Ginsburg, Justice Clarence Thomas, and Justice Elena Kagan.

== Personal life ==
Whelan has four children and lives in the Washington, D.C. area.

== See also ==
- List of law clerks for the ninth seat of the Supreme Court of the United States
