= Marble Freedom Trust =

Conservative political group in the US

- Formation: April 2020; 6 years ago
- Type: 501(c)(4)
- Chairman: Leonard Leo
- CIO: Alex Marshall
- Revenue: $62.28 million (2024)
- Expenses: $200.65 million (2024)
- Endowment: $992 million (2024)

The Marble Freedom Trust is an American conservative political advocacy group structured as a 501(c)(4) social welfare organization. Leonard Leo is the group's trustee and chairman.

== History ==
The Marble Freedom Trust (MFT) was established in April 2020, and by March 2021, it had effectively been given $1.65 billion by Barre Seid. The money was transferred to the MFT in the form of ownership of the electronics company Tripp Lite by its sole owner Seid. In March 2021, the company was purchased from the Trust by the Eaton Corporation, with the result that the Trust had cash assets of $1.65 billion.

In the tax year ending in April 2022, the Marble Freedom Trust donated $182.7 million to other organizations and causes.

In 2022, the MFT was headquartered in North Salt Lake, Utah, and its administrative trustee was Tyler Green.

== Positions ==
The Marble Freedom Trust generally promotes positions and causes consistent with conservatism in the United States.

The MFT aims "to transform ESG environmental, social, and governance (ESG) investing into a rallying cry against woke capitalism." Since 2021, the MFT has invested in fighting against both ESG and diversity, equity, and inclusion efforts at BlackRock, Vanguard, American Airlines, Coca-Cola, State Farm, Major League Baseball and Ticketmaster. In 2024, Leonard Leo said that the Trust would devote $1 billion to "crush liberal dominance", especially in news and entertainment.
