= Alfred J. Freddoso =

American philosopher (born 1946)

- Born: 1946 (age 79–80)

Philosophical work
- Era: 21st-century philosophy
- Region: Western philosophy
- Institutions: University of Notre Dame

Alfred J. Freddoso (born 1946) is an American philosopher and Professor Emeritus of Philosophy and John and Jean Oesterle Professor Emeritus of Thomistic Studies at the University of Notre Dame. He is the father of David Freddoso.

== See also ==
- American philosophy
- List of American philosophers
