= Mollie Hemingway =

American author, columnist, and political commentator (born 1974)

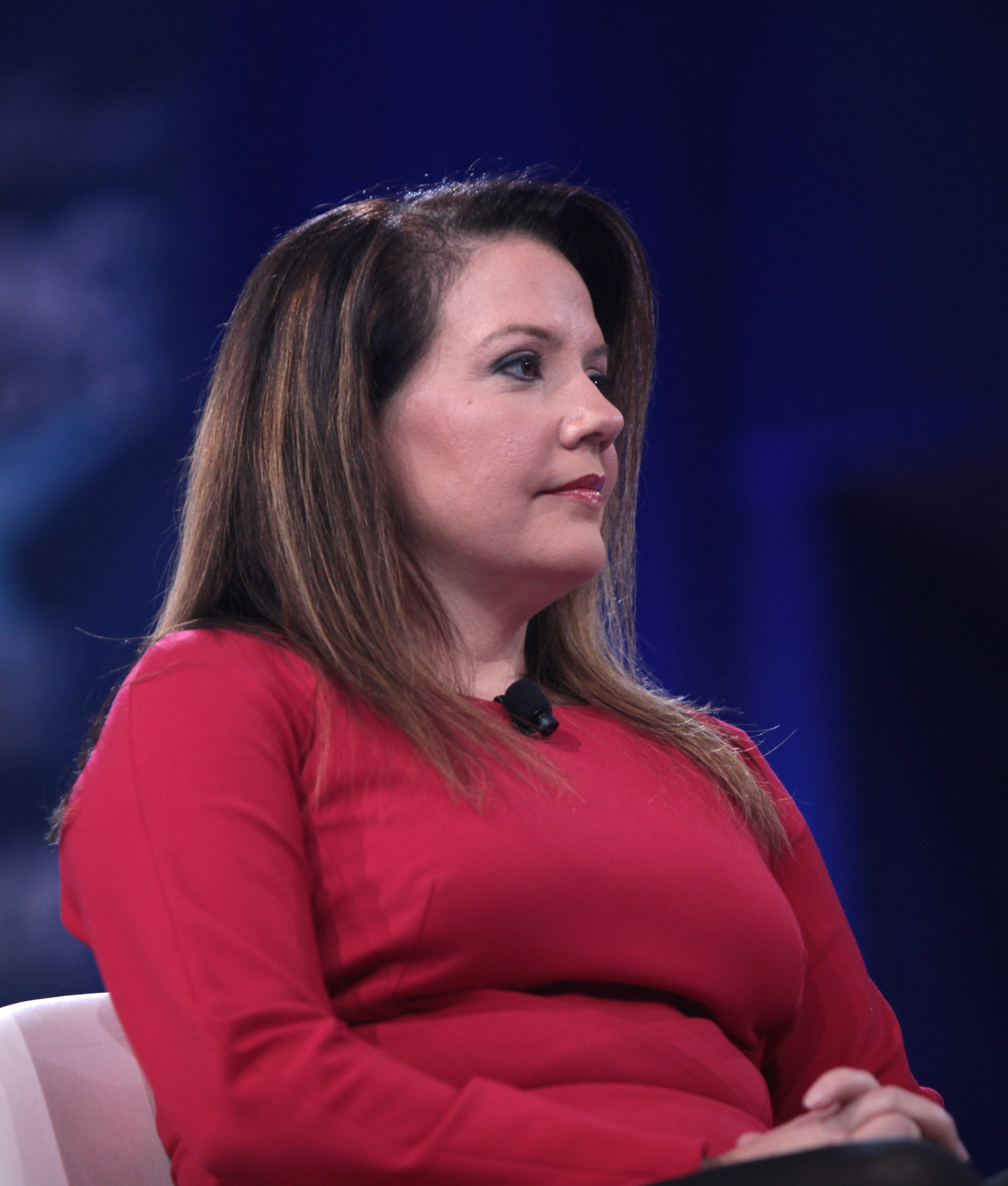
- Hemingway in 2016
- Born: Mollie Ziegler; August 3, 1974 (age 52); Denver, Colorado, U.S.
- Education: University of Colorado Denver (BA)
- Occupations: Author, columnist, political commentator
- Spouse: Mark Hemingway (m. 2006)

Mollie Ziegler Hemingway (born August 3, 1974) is an American conservative author, columnist, and political commentator. She is the editor in chief of the online magazine The Federalist and a contributor for Fox News.

Initially, during the 2016 Republican primary, Hemingway was a pronounced critic of Donald Trump. However, over time, Hemingway turned into a vocal supporter of Trump, marking a significant shift in stance.

== Early life and education ==
Mollie Ziegler was born in Denver, Colorado. Her father is a retired pastor of the Lutheran Church–Missouri Synod and her mother is a retired schoolteacher. She earned a degree in economics from the University of Colorado Denver.

== Political and other commentary ==
In 2002, she moved to Gannett Publishing, where she worked at the Federal Times.

Hemingway has written columns in publications such as the Wall Street Journal, National Review, The New York Times Magazine, and Ricochet. She was one of the founding members of The Federalist. She became a Claremont Institute Lincoln Fellow in 2014. She has appeared multiple times on C-SPAN. In 2017, she became a Fox News contributor. Her columns have been published in USA Today, The Los Angeles Times, The Guardian, The Washington Post, CNN, and RealClearPolitics.

=== Views ===
Early in the 2016 presidential campaign, she described then-candidate Donald Trump as "a demagogue with no real solutions for anything at all." However, since then, she has been described as pro-Trump, with Politico describing her as "a reliably pro-Trump commentator", while Salon called her The Federalist's "most reliable Trump defender". The New York Times wrote in 2020 that Hemingway's columns "have earned presidential retweets and affirmation for their scathing criticism of Democrats and the news media, whom she accuses of lying about just about everything when it comes to the president."

In May 2017, Hemingway defended Trump's decision to fire FBI Director James Comey. In July 2017, after Comey testified to Congress, Hemingway questioned Comey's character, saying "this is not a choir boy here. [Comey] could teach masterclasses in how to cover your own behind and engage in typical Washington, DC shenanigans."

In February 2018, she argued that Carter Page, a former Trump campaign advisor who had been subjected to intelligence surveillance since 2014, had his civil liberties violated. Hemingway stated, "if the civil rights and civil liberties of Carter Page can be violated, they can be violated for anyone." Page, who had relationships with numerous Russian citizens and held pro-Putin views, had been the subject of attempted recruitment by Russian intelligence since 2013. In April 2019, the Mueller Report revealed that investigators found no direct evidence that Page coordinated Trump campaign activities with the Russian government.

In May 2018, Trump tweeted a quote attributed to Hemingway which gave credence to a conspiracy theory initiated by Trump in May 2018 that the Obama administration had placed a spy in his 2016 presidential campaign for political purposes, and stated that the surveillance was "unprecedented and scandalous." Vox countered statements such as Hemingway's, stating that while an FBI informant did meet with several Trump campaign advisers, the FBI didn't actually intend to spy on Trump, but was instead "most likely part of a legitimate counterintelligence operation targeted at Russia's election interference campaign..."

In November 2018, Hemingway described Special Counsel Robert Mueller's investigation into Russian interference in the 2016 election as "a very Stalinist-type approach to criminal justice."

In November 2019, Hemingway named the alleged whistleblower who exposed the Trump-Ukraine scandal. The Daily Beast wrote that naming the whistleblower "seemingly break[s] the network's policy of identifying the person."

In June 2020, she accused the media of fabricating reports that law enforcement used tear gas and excessive force against peaceful protestors to clear a path for Trump to stage a photo op in front of St. John's Church. Law enforcement later acknowledged that it did in fact shoot pepper-based irritants into the crowd. A June 2021 report by the inspector general confirmed that law enforcement's action was not for Trump's photo op but rather "to allow a contractor to safely install anti-scale fencing in response to destruction of Federal property and injury to officers that occurred on May 30 and May 31."

=== Reception ===
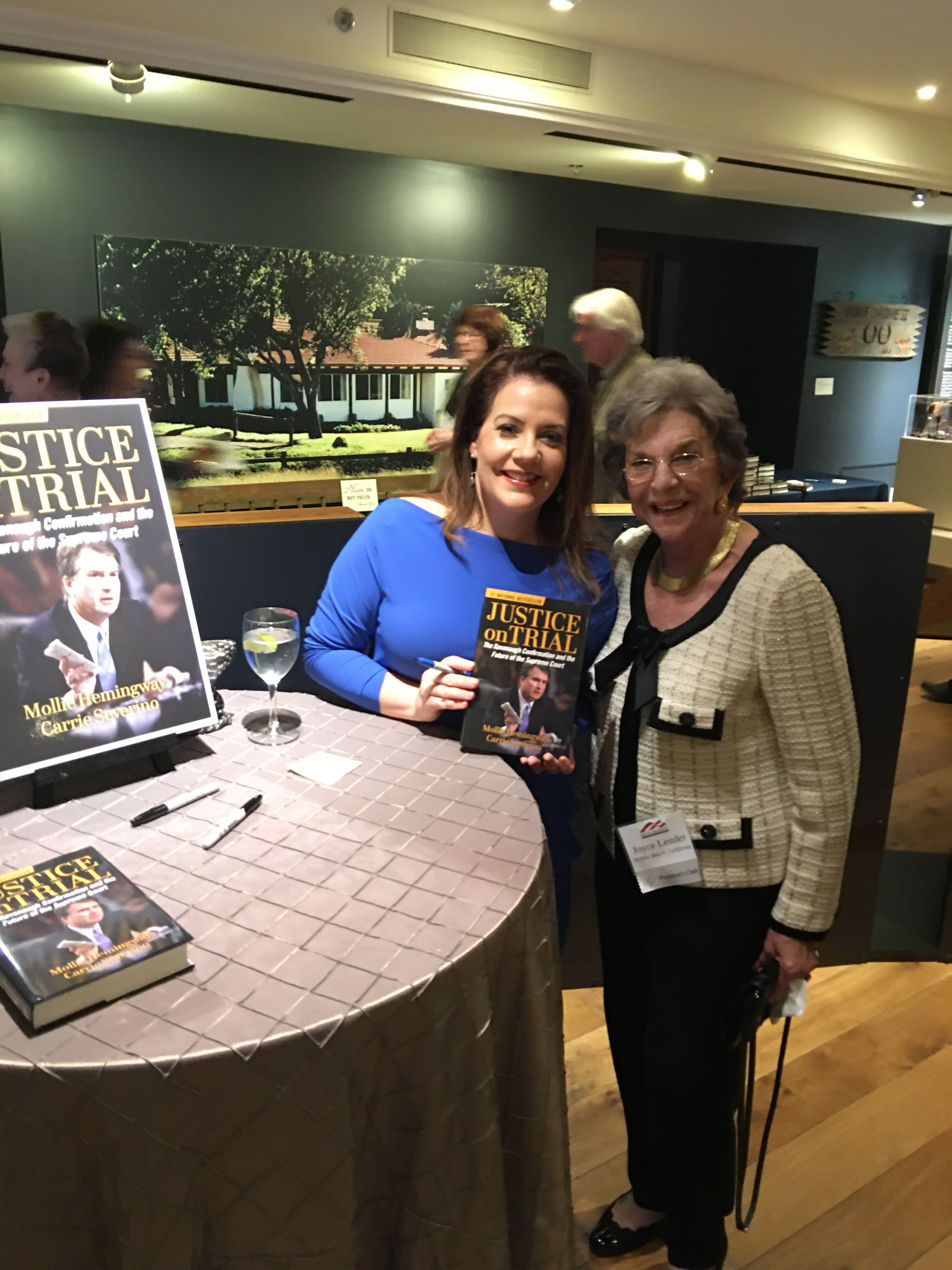
Hemingway (left) in 2019 promoting her book

Washington Post columnist Dana Milbank criticized conservative panelists, including Hemingway, for concluding in a discussion that marriage is good for women.

In 2016, New York Times writer Ana Marie Cox characterized Hemingway as "no fan of Donald Trump", despite Hemingway's writing for conservative publication The Federalist. Cox characterized Hemingway as surprisingly open on issues of marriage and sexuality for a conservative Christian, saying she "sound[s] a little bit like a feminist in talking about sex..."

Charlotte Hays of the Independent Women's Forum described her as "a lightning rod in the debates about feminism and religious liberty" and, "a big deal in conservative-leaning intellectual circles of the nation's capital."

Jonathan Chait of New York Magazine has said that Hemingway's work is becoming increasingly reactionary during the Trump era, adding that she has joined a cadre of conservatives whose "increasingly right-wing character has been mixed with a conviction that Democratic elections are inherently fraudulent, and that extra-legal processes can be justified as countermeasures".

=== Books ===
Hemingway has written four books:

- Trump vs. the Media (Encounter Broadsides Book 51) (2017 Encounter Books) ISBN 1594039763
- Justice on Trial: The Kavanaugh Confirmation and the Future of the Supreme Court with Carrie Severino (2019 Regnery Publishing) ISBN 1621579832
- Rigged: How the Media, Big Tech, and the Democrats Seized Our Elections (2021 Regnery Publishing) ISBN 168451259X,
- Alito: The Justice Who Reshaped the Supreme Court and Restored the Constitution (2026 Basic Liberty) ISBN 1541607139,

She has contributed to four other books, including Dual Citizens: Politics and American Evangelicalism, The Seven Deadly Virtues: 18 Conservative Writers on Why the Virtuous Life is Funny as Hell, The Christmas Virtues: A Treasury of Conservative Tales for the Holidays, and Conservative Christmas Quotables. She authored the pamphlet, Imprimis – September 2017 – Russian Collusion?.

== Personal life ==
Mollie Hemingway has been married to Mark Hemingway since 2006. They have two daughters.

== In film ==
In Gosnell: The Trial of America's Biggest Serial Killer, the reporter Mollie Mullaney is based on both Mollie Hemingway and Calkins Media columnist J. D. Mullane.
