= Barre Seid =

American businessman (born 1932)

- Born: 1932 (age 93–94)
- Education: University of Chicago (BA)
- Occupation: Businessman
- Known for: Former owner of Tripp Lite, political donor
- Spouse(s): Adrienne Gruber; Barbara Landis

Barre Seid (born 1932) is an American businessman from Chicago. He was the owner of Tripp Lite, an electrical products manufacturer. Seid donated the company to Marble Freedom Trust, a funder of conservative causes, which in 2021 sold Tripp Lite to American Irish power company Eaton for $1.65 billion.

== Early life and education ==
Seid was born in 1932 to Dr. Reuben Seid and Anne R. Seid, who were Russian Jewish immigrants. He grew up on the South Side of Chicago. Seid has two brothers. Seid attended the University of Chicago under a special bachelor's degree program. In 2010, Seid was given an honorary degree by Israel's Bar-Ilan University.

== Career ==
After attending college, Seid served for two years in the U.S. Army. He then returned to Chicago to take a job as an assistant to investor and businessman Graham Trippe, owner of Trippe Manufacturing. In the mid-1960s, Seid became president of Trippe Manufacturing, an electrical products manufacturer that later became known as Tripp Lite. He held that position for more than 50 years. Seid owned 100% of the company.

== Philanthropy ==
Many of Seid's donations have been made anonymously. Public donations are made through the Barbara and Barre Seid Foundation. His donation of Tripp Lite, worth $1.6 billion, to the Marble Freedom Trust, a newly formed group led by Leonard Leo, was called the largest single known contribution to a politically-focused nonprofit as of 2022. He also gave at least $775 million in charitable donations between 1996 and 2018.

=== Political ===
Seid opposed the ban of DDT and funded activists and researchers who opposed the ban. Seid's giving reflects his belief that global warming is not the result of human emissions. According to ProPublica, Seid appears to have given $17 million to fund the distribution of the documentary film Obsession: Radical Islam's War Against the West during the 2008 presidential campaign. In 2008, the Clarion Fund sent out the film, on DVD, to 28 million houses and religious institutions. He has donated to the University of Chicago's Becker Friedman Institute for Economics and the Heartland Institute.

In 2020, Seid donated all Tripp Lite stock to the newly created nonprofit group Marble Freedom Trust headed by Leonard Leo, a conservative legal activist. In March 2021, Marble Freedom Trust sold it to the Eaton Corporation for $1.65 billion. The donation was made anonymously, but Seid's identity was first confirmed by The New York Times based on public financial disclosures. The New York Times described the donation as "among the largest single contributions ever to a politically focused nonprofit."

=== Educational ===
Seid is a benefactor of Hillsdale College. According to ProPublica, activists have suspected that Seid is the anonymous donor who gave $20 million to have the George Mason University School of Law renamed the Antonin Scalia Law School.

From 2007 to 2008, Seid gave $825,000 to Shimer College as an anonymous donor through his foundation. His donation was later made public by a former student who examined tax filings. In January 2009, Thomas Lindsay became president of the school, with goals to increase the school's name recognition and build its board of trustees. Through 2009, Lindsay increased the 22-member board by 13 members, with many having financial ties to Seid. Many of the new board members shared conservative political affiliations, leading some alumni, students, and faculty to argue that the school was undergoing a "right-wing attempt to take over its board and administration." In 2010, Lindsay moved to rewrite the school's mission statement, though he was faced with overwhelming opposition by the school's assembly of faculty, staff, and students. The trustees adopted the redrafted statement in February, but by April, the trustees voted 18 to 16 to dismiss Lindsay from the presidency.

== Personal life ==
Seid was married to Adrienne Gruber Seid. In 1976, he established the Adrienne Gruber Seid Memorial Scholarship at the School of the Art Institute of Chicago (SAIC) in memory of his late wife, who was a student there in the early 1960s. Seid is married to Barbara Landis. Since 2005, Landis is the general and artistic director of Chamber Opera Chicago, which was founded by Seid. Seid identifies as a libertarian. He has used the pseudonym Ebert or Elbert Howell.
