= Ginni Thomas =

American conservative activist (born 1957)

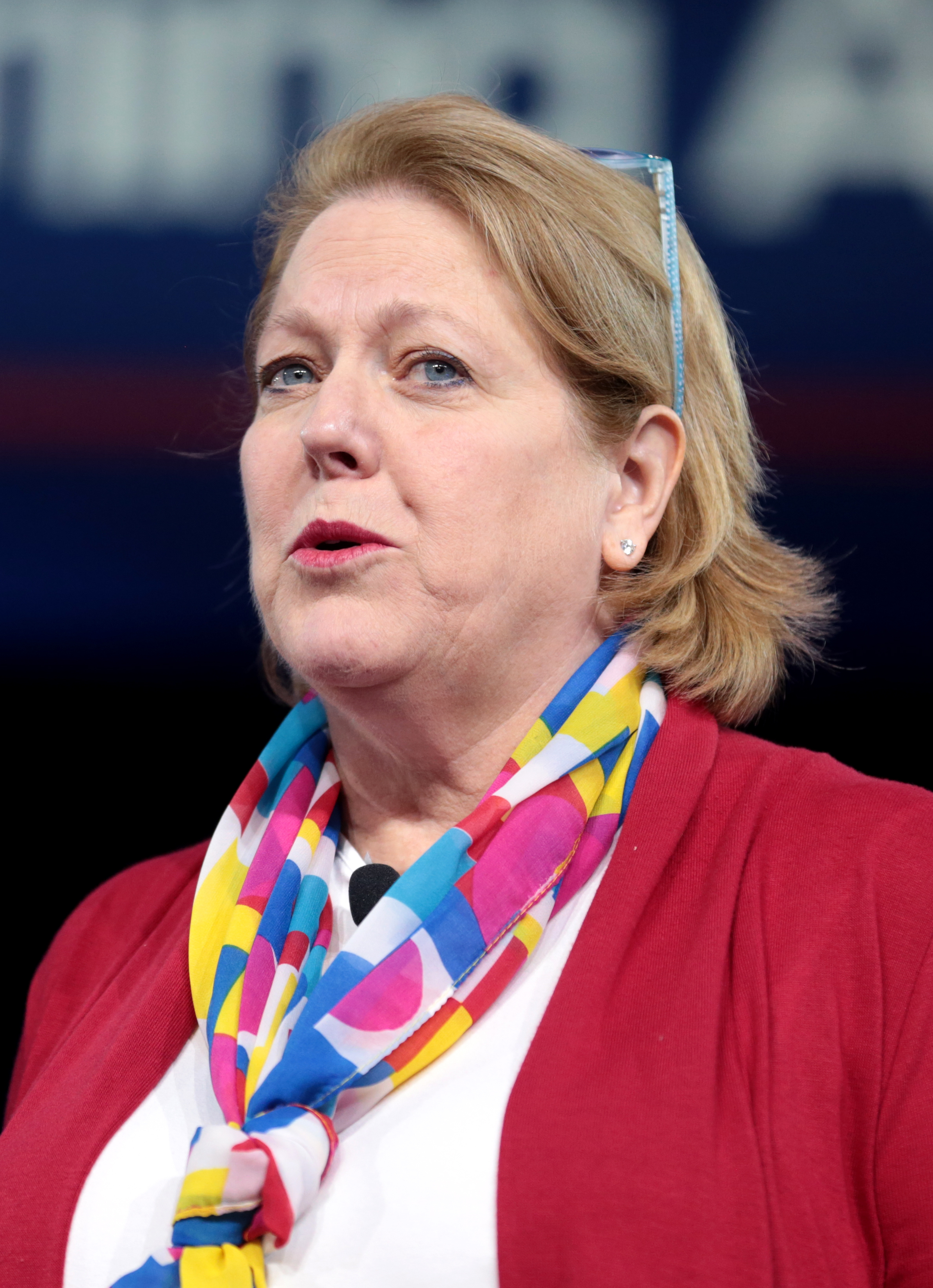
- Thomas in 2017
- Born: Virginia Bess Lamp; February 23, 1957 (age 69); Omaha, Nebraska, U.S.
- Education: Creighton University (BA, JD)
- Occupation: Activist
- Political party: Republican
- Spouse: Clarence Thomas (m. 1987)

Virginia Bess Thomas (née Lamp; born February 23, 1957) is an American conservative activist. In 1987, she married Clarence Thomas, who became an associate justice of the Supreme Court of the United States in 1991. Her activism has drawn scrutiny, as spouses of Supreme Court justices typically avoid engaging in political activity.

Thomas received a Bachelor of Arts in political science and business communication from Creighton University and a Juris Doctor from the Creighton University School of Law. She began her career working for Republican Hal Daub while he was a member of the United States House of Representatives. She went on to work for the United States Chamber of Commerce. She later worked for the United States Department of Labor and as an aide to Republican Dick Armey while he was a member of the House of Representatives.

In 2000, Thomas joined The Heritage Foundation, where she was a liaison between the conservative think tank and the George W. Bush administration. In 2009, Thomas founded Liberty Central, a conservative political advocacy nonprofit organization associated with the Tea Party movement. She founded Liberty Consulting in 2010.

Thomas supported Donald Trump during his first presidency, offering the administration recommendations on individuals to hire through her work with the conservative Groundswell group. Following Joe Biden's victory in the 2020 presidential election, she repeatedly urged Trump's chief of staff Mark Meadows to take steps to overturn the result. Thomas also emailed state lawmakers in Arizona and Wisconsin, urging them to ignore the results of the election and vote instead for an alternate slate of electors. She made an early social media endorsement of the Trump rally that preceded the January 6 attack on the United States Capitol before the violence took place, and she later apologized for contributing to a rift among her husband's former Supreme Court clerks concerning that riot.

== Early life and education ==
Virginia Bess Lamp grew up in Omaha, Nebraska, the youngest of four children born to Donald Lamp, an engineer who owned his own firm, and Marjorie Lamp, a stay-at-home mother and conservative activist. Her parents were Republicans and members of the John Birch Society, an anti-communist and conservative political advocacy group.

Thomas attended Westside High School in Omaha, where she was a member of student government, the debate club, and the Republican club. While she was in high school, her ambition was to be elected to Congress. She enrolled at Mount Vernon College for Women in Washington, D.C. because of its proximity to the Capitol; one of her classmates was Susan Ford, daughter of then-President Gerald Ford. While a student, she interned in the office of Nebraska Congressman John Y. McCollister. During the summer after her freshman year, Thomas worked at the national headquarters of Ronald Reagan's 1976 campaign for president.

That fall, she transferred to the University of Nebraska–Lincoln (and subsequently Creighton University) to be closer to a boyfriend. She received a Bachelor of Arts in political science and business communication from Creighton (1979) and a Juris Doctor from the Creighton University School of Law (1983), after a hiatus working as a legislative aide for Representative Hal Daub.

== Career ==
=== 1981–1991 ===
When Daub took office in 1981, Thomas moved to Washington, D.C., and worked in his office for 18 months. After completing law school in 1983, she had an internship at the National Labor Relations Board and worked one more year for Daub in Washington as his legislative director. From 1985 to 1989, she was employed as an attorney and labor relations specialist at the U.S. Chamber of Commerce, attending congressional hearings where she represented the interests of the business community. Her advocacy included arguing against the passage of the Family and Medical Leave Act of 1993. In 1989, she became manager of employee relations at the Chamber of Commerce.

=== 1991–2009 ===
In 1991, Thomas returned to government service in the Legislative Affairs Office of the U.S. Department of Labor, where she argued against comparable-worth legislation that would have mandated equal pay for women and men in jobs deemed to be comparable.

That year, her husband (whom she had married in 1987), Clarence Thomas, was nominated by President George H. W. Bush to fill the open seat on the U.S. Supreme Court left by the retirement of Justice Thurgood Marshall. She attended the contentious U.S. Senate confirmation hearings and supported her husband as he was accused of sexual harassment.

During the confirmation hearings, several Democratic senators questioned whether her job with the Labor Department could create a conflict of interest for her husband if he were to be seated on the Supreme Court. After her husband was confirmed by a vote of 52 to 48, she described the televised scrutiny and confirmation process as a "trial by fire".

Her next job was as a policy analyst for Representative Dick Armey, who was the House Republican Conference chairman.

By 2000, she was working for The Heritage Foundation, where she collected résumés for potential presidential appointments in the George W. Bush administration when the Supreme Court was deciding Bush v. Gore. She continued to work at The Heritage Foundation during the administration of George W. Bush, serving as White House liaison for the think tank.

=== 2009–2016 ===
In late 2009, Thomas established the nonprofit lobbying group Liberty Central to organize conservative activists, issue legislative scorecards for U.S. Congress members, and be involved in elections. The group was aimed at opposing what Thomas called the "leftist tyranny'" of President Barack Obama and congressional Democrats, and "protecting the core founding principles" of the nation. Thomas's lobbying activities were raised as a potential source of conflict of interest for her husband. Thomas was interviewed by Sean Hannity on his Fox News show Hannity in June 2010. Asked about potential conflicts between her Liberty Central activities and her husband's position, Thomas replied that "there's a lot of judicial wives and husbands out there causing trouble. I'm just one of many." Liberty Central ceased operations in 2012.

In February 2011, Politico reported that Thomas was the head of a new company, Liberty Consulting, which filed incorporation papers in mid-November 2010. The company's website stated that clients could use Thomas's "experience and connections" to help with "governmental affairs efforts" and political donation strategies. The Washington Post described Liberty Consulting as "a one-woman shop" where Thomas advised political donors how to direct funds in the post-Citizens United v. FEC landscape. Also in 2011, Thomas became a special correspondent for Tucker Carlson's The Daily Caller.

The Washington Post reported in May 2023 that in 2011 and 2012 Leonard Leo of the Federalist Society instructed Kellyanne Conway and her firm The Polling Company to pay $80,000 to Liberty Consulting, a firm owned by Thomas. Leo directed Conway to bill the payments to Judicial Education Project with "No mention of Ginni, of course" in the paperwork. The Post could not determine the precise nature of any work Thomas did for either firm, though it noted Judicial Education Project filed a brief to the Supreme Court in a 2012 landmark voting rights case. A longtime friend of the Thomases, Leo told the Post, "Knowing how disrespectful, malicious and gossipy people can be, I have always tried to protect the privacy of Justice Thomas and Ginni."

=== 2016–present ===
Thomas endorsed Ted Cruz in the 2016 Republican Party presidential primaries. She supported Donald Trump after he won the Republican nomination, and has served on the advisory council of Turning Point USA. Thomas has drawn attention for making controversial social media posts; The Washington Post wrote that she had shared "nakedly partisan, erroneous propaganda". On Facebook, she has shared a George Soros conspiracy theory meme and criticized gun control advocates such as survivors of the 2018 Stoneman Douglas High School shooting.

Thomas is a member of the informal conservative Groundswell group, which she founded with the support of Steve Bannon, a former Trump advisor. According to a February 2020 report by Jonathan Swan in Axios, Thomas actively urged Trump to change the personnel in his administration. Swan reported that Thomas had given Trump a memo with names of individuals recommended by the Groundswell network.

On May 28, 2020, Trump appointed Thomas as a member of the trust fund board of the Library of Congress. She is a member of the conservative Council for National Policy, and in 2019, she became part of its board.

==== Efforts to overturn the results of the 2020 presidential election ====
According to The New York Times, in the days following the 2020 presidential election, the board of the Council for National Policy issued a call to action to its members to keep Trump in power, despite his loss. The call to action instructed members to "pressure Republican lawmakers into challenging the election results and appointing alternate slates of electors." Days after the November 2020 election, with Biden declared the winner in Arizona, Thomas sent emails to 29 of the state's legislators, urging them to choose "a clean slate of Electors." Thomas also emailed Wisconsin state senator Kathy Bernier and Wisconsin state representative Gary Tauchen with verbatim copies of the Arizona emails, urging them to set aside the results of the popular vote in their state and instead choose their own electors.

Prior to January 6, Thomas promoted a Stop the Steal rally on Facebook. Thomas said that she attended the Stop the Steal rally that preceded the January 6 U.S. Capitol attack but left before Trump took the stage at noon.

After January 6, baseless claims that Thomas had paid to shuttle demonstrators to Washington D.C. proliferated online. A year after the storming of the U.S. Capitol, fact checkers again debunked claims that Thomas was one of the organizers of the events of January 6, 2021.

After the Capitol attack, Thomas, on a private email list of her husband's former law clerks, expressed her apologies for contributing to a rift among the group. The internal rift reportedly concerned "pro-Trump postings and former Thomas clerk John Eastman, who spoke at the rally and represented Trump in some of his failed lawsuits filed to overturn the 2020 election results." Eastman is a close friend of both Thomases.

An April 2022 Quinnipiac poll found that 52% of Americans said that, in light of Ginni Thomas's texts to Trump's White House Chief of Staff, Mark Meadows about overturning the results of the 2020 presidential election, Clarence Thomas should recuse himself from cases about the 2020 election.

==== Select Committee to Investigate the January 6th Attack ====
In March 2022, texts between Thomas and White House Chief of Staff Mark Meadows from 2020 were handed to the Select Committee on the January 6 Attack. The texts show her repeatedly urging Meadows to overturn the results of the 2020 presidential election, which she called "the greatest Heist of our History," and repeating false conspiracy theories about ballot fraud. She urged that conspiracy theorist attorney Sidney Powell be retained by the Trump campaign efforts to overturn the 2020 election. In the quoted texts, Thomas described an unknown number of American citizens that she hoped would be "living in barges off GITMO" in accord with the false QAnon-affiliated conspiracy theory that President Biden, his family, and thousands of state and county election officials, administrators, and volunteers successfully orchestrated and performed a vast conspiracy to rig the 2020 elections across thousands of administrative districts or wards. Public perception of the likelihood of such QAnon-style conspiracy theories influencing a justice of the U.S. Supreme Court was widespread enough that President Biden was asked what he thought about whether Clarence Thomas should recuse himself from any January 6-related cases. He replied that the answer is for others to determine, mentioning the congressional investigating committee and the Department of Justice. Under U.S. law, each justice of the court is the main and possibly only person who has power over his or her own recusal.

CNN reported in June 2022 that the Select Committee possessed email correspondence between Thomas and John Eastman. The emails were part of Eastman's correspondence related to efforts to overturn the 2020 presidential election. In the wake of revelations regarding her correspondence with Eastman, Thomas was asked to testify before the committee. In an interview with the Daily Caller, Thomas stated that she "can't wait to clear up misconceptions. I look forward to talking to them." Thomas previously signed on to a letter to House minority leader, Kevin McCarthy, calling for the removal of Rep. Liz Cheney and Rep. Adam Kinzinger from the Republican conference for their participation on the Select Committee and describing the January 6 investigations as "bringing disrespect to our country's rule of law." Mark Paoletta, Thomas's attorney, wrote the committee days later that she would not agree to be interviewed unless additional information came to light that might warrant testimony, but one of her attorneys subsequently announced she would speak voluntarily with the committee. The committee interviewed her on September 29.

Days after it became known Eastman and Thomas had communicated by email, Eastman posted on his new Substack blog one email that he captioned, "OMG, Mrs. Thomas asked me to give an update about election litigation to her group. Stop the Presses!" In the December 4, 2020 email, Thomas invited Eastman to speak four days later at a gathering of "Frontliners," which she described as a group of "grassroots state leaders." A private Facebook group named "FrontLiners for Liberty," which included over 50 people and was created in August 2020, showed Thomas as an administrator. The group's front page carried a banner stating, "the enemy of America...is the radical fascist left." After CNBC asked Thomas about the group, its public pages were either made private or deleted. CNBC also contacted Stephanie Coleman, who was also listed as a group administrator. She is the widow of former Texas solicitor general Greg Coleman, who had clerked for Clarence Thomas. Numerous photos of her and Thomas are on her personal Facebook page, including one of both of them with former Trump chief strategist Steve Bannon in December 2016. The Thomas email was among those federal judge David Carter ordered Eastman to release to the January 6 committee in June 2022, as Eastman sought to withhold them. Carter found ten documents he ordered released to the committee relating to three December 2020 meetings by a secretive group strategizing about how to overturn the election, which included who he characterized as a "high-profile" leader. Carter noted one email in particular among those he ordered released that contained what he found was likely evidence of a crime. Thomas attended a meeting of FrontLiners for Liberty on March 6, 2021, at which a speaker declared Trump was still the "legitimate president," to enthusiastic applause.

Thomas also emailed state lawmakers in Arizona and Wisconsin, urging them to ignore the results of the 2020 presidential election and vote instead for an alternate slate of electors.

According to transcripts of her interviews with the Select Committee on the January 6 attack, Thomas noted that she communicated with Mark Meadows to advocate for Trump's support of Sidney Powell, who was pushing false accusations about hacked voting machines. She further claimed that she did not communicate her election-related activities to her husband, Clarence. However, Thomas also noted that she referenced her "best friend" (i.e. her husband) in her texts to Meadows when discussing the support that her husband provided when she was upset over Trump's election defeat. In her interviews, Thomas also admitted that she had sent emails to lawmakers in key states and that she still believed that the 2020 election results were impacted by fraud, despite not being able to provide any evidence. Thomas also noted that with regard to her texts to Meadows, she "would take them all back if I could today;" she attributed her communications with Meadows as being the result of her being "emotional" after Trump's election defeat.

==== Support for Freedom Caucus ====
On January 4, 2023, the Conservative Action Project published an open letter opposing Kevin McCarthy during the election of the Speaker of the House of Representatives and supporting the House Freedom Caucus's efforts to vote against him. Thomas signed the open letter.

== Personal life ==
Ginni and Clarence Thomas married in 1987. The couple lives in Virginia. In an interview, Ginni's uncle said of the couple, "I can guarantee you I was surprised when I found out she was going with a black man", to which her aunt added, "but he was so nice, we forgot he was black, and he treated her so well all of his other qualities made up for his being black."

Thomas converted from Protestantism to her husband's Catholic faith in 2002. She was inspired by his devotion of praying the Litany of Humility and participating in the Mass. She credits Justice Antonin Scalia and his wife Maureen for helping her husband back into the Church.

On October 9, 2010, Thomas left a voicemail message for Anita Hill, whose accusations of sexual harassment against her husband complicated his Supreme Court nomination hearings 19 years earlier. In the voicemail, Thomas said that Hill should apologize to her husband. Hill responded that there was nothing to apologize for and said that her 1991 testimony about her interactions with Clarence Thomas was truthful.

In 2011, Clarence Thomas amended 20 years worth of his financial disclosures to include Ginni Thomas's places of employment.

=== Lifespring ===
In the 1980s, while a congressional aide, Thomas took training with the self-awareness program Lifespring. In 1987, she told The Washington Post that, during her training several years earlier, she had been "confused and troubled" by lessons such as one where trainees were told to disrobe to bikinis and bathing suits and then "made fun of fat people's bodies and ridiculed one another with sexual questions". After realizing that membership in her Lifespring group was separating her from her family, friends, and co-workers, Thomas said she began what proved to be a difficult and months-long process of breaking away. At one point, she hid in another part of the U.S. to avoid a constant barrage of high-pressure phone calls from Lifespring members, who felt they had a duty to keep her in the organization.

Thomas came to believe that Lifespring was a cult. After leaving the group in 1985, she sought counseling and joined the Cult Awareness Network. She became a critic of controversial religious groups, speaking on panels and organizing anti-cult workshops for congressional staffers in 1986 and 1988. In a 1991 interview, Thomas remarked, "I was once in a group that used mind control techniques", and she called its members "pretty scary people".
