= David Freddoso =

American journalist

- Born: South Bend, Indiana, U.S.
- Education: University of Notre Dame (BA); Columbia University (MA)
- Occupation: Journalist
- Known for: Political commentary
- Spouse: Nagore Goitiandia (m. 2009)
- Children: 2
- Father: Alfred J. Freddoso

David Freddoso is an American political conservative commentator, journalist, and author, best known for writing three books critical of the Barack Obama administration as well as for his columns for the National Review Online and the Washington Examiner. The first book, The Case Against Barack Obama, reached the New York Times bestseller list as well as the Amazon.com official Top 20 list. Having worked in politics since 2002, his latest book is Spin Masters: How the Media Ignored the Real News and Helped Re-elect Barack Obama, which he published January 28, 2013. His writings have involved criticism of what he sees as left-liberal media bias in the American journalistic mainstream.

== Background and career ==
Originally from South Bend, Indiana, Freddoso studied Classical Greek at the University of Notre Dame (1999) and earned a master's in journalism at Columbia's Pulitzer School (2000) before covering southwest Brooklyn at the weekly Home Reporter and Sunset News. In 2002 he worked at the conservative weekly newspaper Human Events. He went on to work at the National Review where he covered Capitol Hill for six years, and served as an assistant for columnist Robert Novak for three years at the Evans–Novak Political Report. A former editorial page editor at the Washington Examiner, he is now serving as a regular columnist.

Freddoso published his first book, The Case Against Barack Obama, on August 4, 2008. It was released by the conservative group Regnery Publishing, Inc. Marji Ross, Regnery President, later told USA Today that she saw "a pent-up demand from people on the right side of the aisle who feel that the mainstream media is effusively covering Barack Obama and not critically covering him". Freddoso notably promoted his work on the Fox News program Hannity and Colmes in August 2008, arguing his case to critical commentator Alan Colmes.

In the book, Freddoso called Barack Obama "a shrewd machine-aligned politician from Chicago who will make no waves and won't back no losers" trying to act post-partisan while he held doctrinaire left-liberal views. Although receiving little in the way of critical attention or mainstream media coverage in general, Freddoso's book reached the official Top 20 of Amazon.com's best-seller list. It sold nearly 300,000 copies in print by August 2008. The book also became a New York Times best-seller.

Freddoso's second work, Gangster Government: Barack Obama and the New Washington Thugocracy, was released on April 4, 2011. The title term comes from articles written by commentator and author Michael Barone, who also wrote the foreword. Released through Regnery Publishing, the book received positive reviews by fellow conservative writers such as Ann Coulter, Tim Carney, and Terence P. Jeffrey.

His latest book is Spin Masters: How the Media Ignored the Real News and Helped Re-elect Barack Obama, which he published on January 28, 2013. He received praise from journalist Katie Pavlich of TownHall.com, who told her readers "read it and remember it next time you watch the news". In the Freddoso's book, he wrote,

"Sure the mainstream media tilt left- even wildly left. We all know that, right? But it's even worse than you think. The trouble is not just bias- it's that the media no longer even bother to report the news or investigate big stories."

== Columns and viewpoints ==
Although on the political right-wing, Freddoso has strongly criticized modern Republicans as being too close to special interests in Washington D.C. and too beholden to corporate cronyism. In an article for Human Events written after the 2006 midterm election in which the Democratic Party took over the U.S. House, he argued, "They paid the price for failing to adopt meaningful ethics and lobbying reforms that would change the way Washington works." He also blasted President George W. Bush as a "useless political leader" that led "an incompetent White House that has us stuck endlessly in Iraq", asserting that Bush "killed the GOP".

In September 2025, Twitter notified Freddoso that he had created a community note about the Buffalo Bills that had earned the status of "Helpful".

== Personal life ==
Freddoso has two children. He is a Roman Catholic and a frequent Twitter poster. He has one sister and three brothers, the children of Notre Dame philosophy professor Alfred J. Freddoso.

== Works ==
- The Case Against Barack Obama: The Unlikely Rise and Unexamined Agenda of the Media's Favorite Candidate. Regnery Publishing. 2008. ISBN 978-1-59698-577-3.
- Gangster Government: Barack Obama and the New Washington Thugocracy. Regnery Publishing. 2011. ISBN 978-1-59698-648-0.
- Spin Masters: How the Media Ignored the Real News and Helped Reelect Barack Obama. Regnery Publishing. 2013. ISBN 978-1-62157-150-6.
