= Leonard Leo =

American lawyer (born 1965)

- Leo in 2017
- Born: 1965 (age 60–61); Northport, New York, U.S.
- Education: Cornell University (BA, JD)
- Title: Chairman of CRC Advisors; Chairman of Marble Freedom Trust; Former Vice President of the Federalist Society
- Political party: Republican
- Movement: American Conservatism
- Board member of: Federalist Society; National Catholic Prayer Breakfast; Liberty Central; Catholic Association; Becket Law Fund
- Spouse: Sally
- Children: 7

Leonard Anthony Leo (born November 1965) is an American lawyer, businessman, and conservative legal activist. He was the longtime vice president of the Federalist Society and is currently, along with Steven Calabresi, the co-chairman of the organization's board of directors.

Leo has created a network of influential conservative legal groups funded mostly by anonymous donors, including The 85 Fund and Concord Fund, which serve as funding hubs for affiliated political nonprofits. He assisted Clarence Thomas in his Supreme Court confirmation hearings and led campaigns to support the nominations of John Roberts, Samuel Alito, Neil Gorsuch, Brett Kavanaugh, and Amy Coney Barrett.

== Early life and education ==
Leonard Anthony Leo was born on Long Island, New York, in November 1965, and raised in suburban New Jersey. His grandfather, an Italian immigrant, was a vice president of clothing company Brooks Brothers. He grew up in a family of practicing Catholics.

Leo's father was a pastry chef, who died when Leo was a toddler. When Leo was five years old, his mother married an engineer, and the family moved to Monroe Township, New Jersey, where he spent most of his childhood. He graduated in 1983 from Monroe Township High School, where he and his future wife, Sally, were both named "Most Likely to Succeed" in the school's yearbook.

Leo attended Cornell University, graduating with a bachelor's degree in 1987. While an undergraduate, he was an intern in the office of Senator Orrin Hatch. He then attended Cornell Law School, graduating with a J.D. in 1989. He then clerked for Judge A. Raymond Randolph of the United States Court of Appeals for the District of Columbia Circuit.

== Career ==
=== Judicial nomination work ===
Leo founded the student chapter of the Federalist Society at Cornell Law School in 1989, and he went to work for the Society in 1991 in Washington, D.C. While a law clerk at the D.C. Circuit, Leo met then-judge Clarence Thomas, and the two became close friends. Leo delayed his start at the Federalist Society to assist Thomas in his Supreme Court confirmation hearings. Leo served at the Federalist Society in various capacities for more than 25 years. In 2019, The Washington Post reported that the Federalist Society had paid Leo an annual salary of more than $400,000 for a number of years.

==== Bush administration ====
Leo took leaves of absence from the Federalist Society to assist the Bush administration's judicial nomination and confirmation efforts. This included the unsuccessful nomination of Miguel Estrada to the District of Columbia Circuit, as well as the successful confirmations of John Roberts and Samuel Alito to the U.S. Supreme Court.

==== Trump administrations ====
In 2017, legal analyst Jeffrey Toobin wrote that Leo was "responsible, to a considerable extent, for one third of the justices on the Supreme Court". The Washington Post would later write that "few people outside government have more influence over judicial appointments now than Leo."

During Donald Trump's first administration, the Federalist Society and Leo played a key role in advising Trump on selecting individuals for federal judicial nomination, something Trump described as "one of the greatest achievements" of his first term. In 2016 Trump said, "We're going to have great judges, conservative, all picked by the Federalist Society."

In May 2025, the U.S. Court of International Trade ruled that Trump had overstepped his executive authority when he imposed sweeping global tariffs. One of the three judges on the trade court was appointed by Trump himself in 2017, in consultation with the Federalist Society. In a social media post on May 29, 2025, Trump denigrated Leo saying:

I was new to Washington, and it was suggested that I use The Federalist Society as a recommending source on Judges. I did so, openly and freely, but then realized that they were under the thumb of a real "sleazebag" named Leonard Leo, a bad person who, in his own way, probably hates America, and obviously has his own separate ambitions. He openly brags how he controls Judges, and even Justices of the United States Supreme Court—I hope that is not so, and don't believe it is! In any event, Leo left The Federalist Society to do his own "thing." I am so disappointed in The Federalist Society because of the bad advice they gave me on numerous Judicial Nominations. This is something that cannot be forgotten! With all of that being said, I am very proud of many of our picks, but very disappointed in others.

After Trump's post, Leo sent out a statement saying "I'm very grateful for President Trump transforming the Federal Courts, and it was a privilege being involved. There's more work to be done, for sure, but the Federal Judiciary is better than it's ever been in modern history, and that will be President Trump's most important legacy."

===== Nomination of Neil Gorsuch =====
In 2016, Leo worked with Senate Majority Leader Mitch McConnell to block President Barack Obama's replacement appointee, Merrick Garland. Leo's nonprofit, the Judicial Crisis Network reported that it spent more than $7 million to prevent Garland's confirmation. After Donald Trump's election, The New York Times described Leo as playing a "critical role" in reshaping the judiciary through Trump's Supreme Court nominees, first contacting then-appellate-judge Neil Gorsuch about potentially nominating him to the vacancy created by Scalia's death.

Leo's CRC Advisors coordinated "a months-long media campaign" in support of Gorsuch's nomination, including "opinion essays, contributing 5,000 quotes to news stories, scheduling pundit appearances on television", as well as television and radio advertisements. Between 2014 and 2017, entities affiliated with Leo raised over $250 million from donors including Charles Koch and Rebekah Mercer.

===== Nomination of Brett Kavanaugh =====
In 2018, Politico reported that Leo had personally lobbied for Brett Kavanaugh's nomination for the Supreme Court seat vacated by Anthony Kennedy, raising upward of $15 million in support of his confirmation. The Judicial Crisis Network ran television and radio advertisements supporting Kavanaugh's nomination, and CRC advisors "hype[d] a theory that Christine Blasey Ford's accusation—that when they were both in high school, Kavanaugh pushed her on a bed and tried to remove her clothing—was actually a case of mistaken identity".

===== Nomination of Amy Coney Barrett =====
In a 2018 interview, when asked about a possible vacancy on the Supreme Court during an election year, Leo stated that "If a vacancy occurs in 2020, the vacancy needs to remain open until a president is elected and inaugurated and can pick. That's my position, period." Leo said he would advise Trump not to act on an election year Supreme Court vacancy, adding that he had never asked Trump about the possible scenario.

After the death of Justice Ruth Bader Ginsburg in September 2020, The Wall Street Journal reported that Leo was involved in the selection process for Ginsburg's replacement. Ultimately, that process resulted in the October 2020 appointment of Amy Coney Barrett.

=== Conservative network building ===
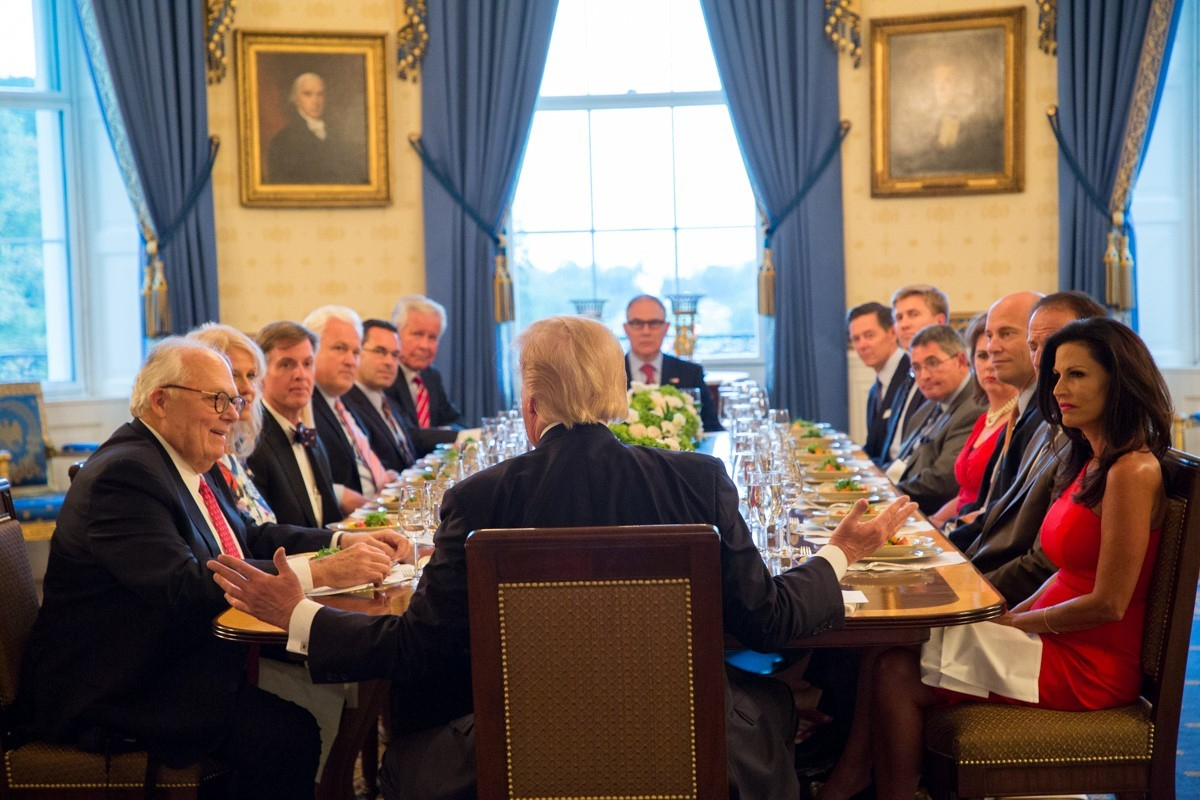
President Trump meets with Leo and others, 2017.

Media outlets have described Leo as the "behind-the-scenes leader of a network of interlocking nonprofits that has raised and spent hundreds of millions of dollars to support conservative judges and causes". Groups affiliated with Leo include CRC Advisors, The 85 Fund; the Concord Fund (formerly the Judicial Crisis Network); the Marble Freedom Trust; the Rule of Law Trust; and the BH Group, among others. The New York Times reported that Leo described this network as an effort to match "a big-money operation" of dark money spending aligned with Democratic Party in 2020. In 2022, the Marble Freedom Trust received a $1.6 billion donation from Illinois businessman Barre Seid, described as "the largest known donation to a political advocacy group in U.S. history".

An October 2022 article by Kenneth P. Vogel in The New York Times detailed how Leo, who had been best known for his role in conservative judicial appointments, developed a larger coalition on the right. In January 2020, Leo announced that he would be leaving his position as vice president at the Federalist Society to start a new for-profit group, CRC Advisors, a conservative political consulting firm. That same year, Leo was paid $500,000 by the Federalist Society. Leo remained in his role as co-chairman of the Federalist Society's board of directors. CRC Advisors continued to work with the Federalist Society, as well as with Leo's Concord Fund and legal activist Edward Whelan.

Vogel wrote that Leo had built "one of the best-funded and most sophisticated operations in American politics, giving him extraordinary influence as he pushes a broad array of hot-button conservative causes and seeks to counter what he sees as an increasing leftward tilt in society". In 2023, ProPublica described Leo's activism, namely through the Teneo Network, (Note: Not to be confused with the Teneo company) as focusing on "'woke-ism' in corporations and education, 'one-sided journalism' and 'entertainment that's really corrupting our youth'"

Teneo, from Latin, meaning "I hold" or "I grasp", says it has a plan to "crush liberal dominance" in journalism and education, as well as in business and politics. It consists of various loosely affiliated non-profit and for-profit entities, which collectively spent nearly $504 million between mid-2015 and 2021. These include two for-profit firms Leo at least partly controls, BH Group and CRC Advisors, which are also compensated by funding hubs in Leo's network, The 85 Fund and the Concord Fund.

The Teneo Network is a member of the advisory board of Project 2025, a collection of conservative and right-wing policy proposals from the Heritage Foundation to reshape the United States federal government and consolidate executive power should the Republican nominee win the 2024 presidential election.

Leo founded The 85 Fund, a nonprofit focused on conservative causes, in 2011. In 2011 and 2012, Leo arranged for Liberty Consulting, owned by Ginni Thomas, the wife of Supreme Court Justice Clarence Thomas, to be paid $80,000 by The Polling Company, owned by Kellyanne Conway and billed through The 85 Fund, formerly known as the Judicial Education Project. Leo directed Conway not to mention Ginni Thomas in paperwork, telling The Washington Post, "The Polling Company, along with Ginni Thomas's help, has been an invaluable resource for gauging public attitudes", and that "Knowing how disrespectful, malicious and gossipy people can be, I have always tried to protect the privacy of Justice Thomas and Ginni."

In June 2023, ProPublica reported that Leo helped organize and attended a fishing trip with Justice Samuel Alito and businessman Paul Singer, whose firms later were parties to litigation before the Supreme Court.

In March 2023, Politico reported that in 2021 and 2022, Leo had moved at least $43 million from his nonprofits into CRC Advisors, a for-profit business which he chairs. In August 2023, the Attorney General for the District of Columbia, Brian Schwalb, began investigating Leo and his network of nonprofit groups after receiving a letter from a progressive watchdog group claiming that Leo-aligned groups had violated nonprofit tax law.

Leo's attorney, David Rivkin, said in October 2023 that Leo would not cooperate with the investigation because Schwalb had "no legal authority" as the Leo nonprofits are not registered in Washington, D.C. Leo's network subsequently engaged in a pressure campaign targeting Schwalb. Twelve Republican attorneys general have challenged the legal basis of Schwalb's probe and Republican members of the U.S. House have announced a probe of Schwalb's investigation.

Leo owns a house on Mount Desert Island, Maine. After he met with leaders of a New England fisherman stewardship association opposed to offshore wind projects, the Concord Fund donated $573,000 to the group in both 2023 and 2024.

In April 2024, the Senate Judiciary Committee issued a subpoena to Leo regarding undisclosed gifts to Supreme Court justices. Within a day, Leo publicly refused to cooperate with the subpoena, calling it "politically motivated" and arising from "dark money".

In September 2024, in an interview with the Financial Times, Leo said that the Marble Freedom Trust would devote $1 billion to "crush liberal dominance" in news and entertainment, and to fight "companies and financial institutions that bend to the woke mind virus". The trust is also supporting Republican efforts to retake the majority in the Senate.

=== Religious work ===
Leo was national co-chairman of Catholic outreach for the Republican National Committee, and as the 2004 Bush presidential campaign's Catholic strategist. He was appointed by President George W. Bush and the United States Senate to three terms on the United States Commission on International Religious Freedom. He is a board member of the National Catholic Prayer Breakfast.

In 2012, Leo served on the boards of the Catholic Association and its affiliate Catholic Association Foundation, which ran campaigns opposing the legalization of same-sex marriage. In 2016, Leo received $120,000 for his work for the Catholic Association.

While Leo was the chairman of the United States Commission on International Religious Freedom, a Muslim policy analyst filed a complaint against the group with the Equal Employment Opportunity Commission alleging that she had been the victim of anti-Muslim discrimination. Leo denied the claims of discrimination against the organization, and no specific claims were made regarding Leo. The EEOC complaint was dismissed.

=== Other appointments and work ===
He has been a US delegate to the United Nations Council and the UN Commission on Human Rights, as well as the Organization for Security and Cooperation in Europe and World Health Assembly. Leo has been an observer at the World Intellectual Property Organization and as a member of the US National Commission to UNESCO.

Leo has been published in The New York Times, The Wall Street Journal, and The Huffington Post. He received the 2009 Bradley Prize.

Leo has been on the board of directors of various organizations such as Reclaim New York, a charity with ties to conservative activists Rebekah Mercer and Steve Bannon; Liberty Central, a charity founded by Virginia Thomas, wife of Clarence Thomas; the Catholic Association and an affiliated charity, the Catholic Association Foundation; The National Catholic Prayer Breakfast; the Becket Law Fund; Students for Life; the Napa Legal Institute; the Youth Leadership Foundation; and the Board of Visitors at The Busch School of Business at Catholic University.

Leo is a member of the Council for National Policy, whose other members include Virginia Thomas, the wife of Clarence Thomas; Brent Bozell, founder of the Media Research Center; and Ralph Reed, chairman of the nonprofit Faith and Freedom Coalition.

In filings with the Federal Election Commission, Leo listed the BH Group as his employer. In 2018, the Judicial Crisis Network reported paying BH Group $1.2 million in fees. In its first two years of existence, the BH Group received more than $4 million from the Judicial Crisis Network, its sister entity the Judicial Education Project and a third nonprofit, the Wellspring Committee. Leo is also the president of the Freedom and Opportunity Fund, which, in 2022, distributed $250 million, including $153 million to the Rule of Law Trust, which is also affiliated with Leo. Leo partially controls America Engaged, a conservative group started in 2016.

In 2016, after the death of US Supreme Court Justice Antonin Scalia, Leo helped finance the renaming of George Mason University's Law School to the Antonin Scalia Law School.

== Personal life ==
Leo is Catholic. He has seven children with his wife, Sally. Their daughter Margaret died in 2007 at the age of 14 from spina bifida. Leo has spoken about the profound impact her life had on him.

Leo is a knight of the Sovereign Military Order of Malta, a Catholic lay religious order. In October 2022, Leo was awarded the John Paul II New Evangelization Award by the Catholic Information Center. In May 2023, Leo received an honorary doctorate from Benedictine College.

== Works ==
- Taranto, James; Leo, Leonard, eds. (July 30, 2004). Presidential Leadership: Rating the best and the worst in the White House. A Wall Street Journal Book. New York City: Free Press. ISBN 978-0-7432-5433-5.
- Leo, Leonard; Gaer, Felice D.; Cassidy, Elizabeth K. (Spring 2011). "Protecting religions from 'defamation': A threat to universal human rights standards" (PDF). Harvard Journal of Law & Public Policy. 34 (2): 769–784. ISSN 0193-4872.
