= Concord Fund =

American political advocacy organization

The Concord Fund
- Formation: 2005
- Dissolved: January 2026; 10 months ago
- Type: 501(c)(4)
- Tax ID no.: 20-2303252
- Location: Washington, D.C.
- Leader: Carrie Severino
- Key people: Leonard Leo
- Affiliations: The 85 Fund; CRC Advisors
- Website: www.judicialnetwork.com
- Formerly called: Judicial Crisis Network

The Concord Fund (formerly the Judicial Crisis Network and the Judicial Confirmation Network) was an American conservative advocacy organization active from 2005 until its dissolution in 2026. Its president was Carrie Severino, a former law clerk for Supreme Court justice Clarence Thomas. In 2020, OpenSecrets described the organization as having "unmatched influence in recent years in shaping the federal judiciary." It was among a network of organizations associated with Leonard Leo, a co-chair of the Federalist Society, that are funded mostly by anonymous donors, with funding distributed by Concord and a related group, The 85 Fund.

== Background ==
The organization was founded in 2005 to promote the judicial appointees of then president George W. Bush. Fundraiser and lawyer Ann Corkery, along with California real estate magnate Robin Arkley II, were key to the beginning of the organization.

Carrie Severino served as the group's president. She was previously a law clerk to United States Supreme Court Justice Clarence Thomas and to Judge David B. Sentelle of the United States Court of Appeals for the District of Columbia Circuit.

== Funding ==
The leading funder of Concord was the Wellspring Committee, which is directed by Ann Corkery. Wellspring was part of the Koch political financing network leading up to the 2008 elections, then was later used by Leonard Leo's associates to direct money to Concord's predecessor organizations. Wellspring, which does not disclose who funds it, gave close to $7 million to Concord in 2014; between 2012 and 2015, it reported giving Concord more than $15 million. Concord's tax return for the period July 2015 to June 2016 shows that one $17.9 million donation, whose source was not reported, accounted for 96.6% of the organization's revenue.

== Advocacy activities ==
In 2013, Concord ran ads in Alaska that were critical of U.S. Senator Mark Begich's votes to approve all of president Barack Obama's federal judicial nominees. The group also ran advertisements that were critical of Mary Landrieu and Mark Pryor's votes for president Obama's court picks. In 2014, the group ran digital advertisements critical of Chris Christie's judicial appointments. Concord has been active in Michigan and North Carolina supreme court elections.

In 2015, the Judicial Crisis Network donated $600,000 to Nebraskans for the Death Penalty, a group promoting reinstatement of capital punishment in Nebraska.

In 2016, Concord ran a negative advertisement about Jane L. Kelly, a federal appeals judge from Iowa who was on a White House list of possible nominees to the U.S. Supreme Court.

Also in 2016, Concord bought advertisements across the country to oppose president Obama's Supreme Court nominee, chief judge of the United States Court of Appeals for the District of Columbia Circuit Merrick Garland. In November 2016, after Donald Trump was elected president of the United States, Concord ran television advertisements praising Senate Judiciary Committee chairman Chuck Grassley for holding the line against Garland. The group also spent over $500,000 on advertisements thanking Trump for his campaign promises regarding the types of justices he would select for the nation's high court. Concord's advertisements asked viewers to thank Trump for pledging to nominate conservative jurists in the mold of Antonin Scalia to the Supreme Court.

On January 31, 2017, the Judicial Crisis Network committed to spending $10 million on advocacy ads in favor of president Donald Trump's first Supreme Court of the United States nominee, Neil Gorsuch.

The Judicial Crisis Network spent $4.5 million in ad buys supportive of the confirmation of Brett Kavanaugh to the U.S. Supreme Court.

In September 2020, after the death of Supreme Court Justice Ruth Bader Ginsburg, Concord launched a $2.2 million campaign to support President Trump's right to appoint a judge prior to the November 2020 presidential election.

In 2022, Concord donated $350,000 to Consumers Defense, the 501(c)4 arm of Consumers' Research, a conservative advocacy group that opposes corporate environmental, social, and governance policies.

In 2024, Concord donated $1 million to a campaign against an amendment legalizing abortion in Missouri and $5 million to Will Scharf's unsuccessful Missouri Attorney General primary campaign. Concord also donated to anti-abortion groups and candidates in Ohio, Kentucky, and South Dakota.

The 85 Fund, formerly known as the Judicial Education Project, is closely aligned with the Concord. Concord has also funded State Armor, a group which lobbies for state laws to combat Chinese Communist Party influence operations.
