= PGI =

PGI may refer to:

== Transportation ==
- Parking guidance and information, signs and other indicators to assist in parking a car
- PGI, IATA code for Chitato Airport in Angola

== Science ==
- PGI_{2} (Prostacyclin), a chemical which regulates blood clotting
- Phosphoglucose isomerase, alternate name for Glucose-6-phosphate isomerase
- Protected geographical indication, one of the three protected denominations for agricultural products of the European Union

== Organizations ==
- PGI (The Portland Group, Inc.), a former software company providing compilers and programming tools, now part of Nvidia
- PGI Management, currently known as Pas Grau International, an Andorra-based ski operation management company
- Communion of Churches in Indonesia (Indonesian: Persekutuan Gereja-Gereja di Indonesia, a.k.a. PGI), a fellowship organisation of Protestant churches in Indonesia
- Philippine Geothermal Production Company (formerly Philippine Geothermal, Inc.), a Philippine energy production subsidiary
- Piranha Games Inc., a Canadian video game developer
- Pontefract General Infirmary, the former name for Pontefract Hospital
- Postgraduate Institute of Medical Education and Research, a medical institute and research centre in Chandigarh, India
- Project for Good Information, American political group
- Pyrotechnics Guild International, association of professional and amateur fireworks enthusiasts
