= BlueLink (software) =

- Formerly: Shadow Inc. Groundbase
- Founded: December 2016
- Founders: Gerard Niemira; Krista Davis
- Headquarters: United States
- Key people: Irene Tollinger (CEO); James Hickey (COO); Krista Davis (CTO and Chief Architect)
- Parent: Civitech PBC
- Website: bluelink.org

BlueLink is a suite of campaign management mobile apps designed to register, organize, and mobilize liberal voters. The suite was formerly known as Shadow, operated by Shadow Inc., before the latter sold it to Acronym, who in turn sold BlueLink to Civitech PBC. The company gained attention after their IowaReporterApp software failed during the 2020 Iowa Democratic caucuses.

== History ==
The company, originally named Groundbase, was launched in December 2016 by Gerard Niemira, and Krista Davis, who both worked on the digital outreach team for Hillary Clinton's 2016 presidential campaign.

In January 2019, the company was acquired by Acronym, a liberal-leaning political nonprofit organization for which Niemira was also the COO and CTO. Shadow is a for-profit company. Acronym's CEO, Tara McGowan, described Shadow as "a political technology company".

Shadow Inc. was then incorporated in Colorado in September 2019. Acronym CEO McGowan said in late January 2020 that Acronym is the sole investor in Shadow.

In May 2020, Shadow Inc. was renamed to Bluelink.

== Locations ==
The company is registered in Colorado, lists its Denver office as its location, and says it has further offices in New York and Seattle. Shadow and its parent company Acronym shared addresses in Denver, Colorado, and Washington, DC.

== Management ==
In May 2019, Gerard Niemira, CEO and CTO of Acronym, became the CEO of Shadow when it was renamed upon the purchase of the "nearly bankrupt company" Groundbase by Acronym. Niemira was formerly a product manager for Hillary Clinton's 2016 campaign, worked at kiva.org, and worked as an intern for Representative Eliot Engel in 2005.

James "Jimmy" Hickey, COO, was an engineering manager for Hillary Clinton's 2016 campaign and previously was part of Sprinklr and Bloomberg Philanthropies.

Krista Davis, CTO and Chief Architect, was previously a software engineer for Hillary Clinton's 2016 campaign. She also worked at Google for eight years. The current CEO is Irene Tollinger, following Niemira stepping down from his position.

== Products ==
Shadow Inc. developed software for the campaigns of numerous Democratic candidates as well as mobile software applications for the 2020 Iowa Democratic caucuses and 2020 Nevada Democratic caucuses.

=== Lightrail ===
Lightrail moves information between different data sources for campaign messaging and data integration purposes. It is the company's flagship product. Acronym announced in November 2019 that Lightrail has been made available to all state parties and national candidates, under a trial contract with the Democratic National Committee. Party insiders have described it as "common in Democratic politics."

=== IowaReporterApp ===
The Iowa Democratic Party paid Shadow Inc. $63,183 to develop the IowaReporterApp. Before the 2020 Iowa caucus, the app and its developer were kept secret from the public by the Democratic Party, although it was made public that there would be an app used for the caucus. The company published a new build (Version 1.1) of the IowaReporterApp two days before the caucuses. A bug in the code of the app caused the app to fail at the time of the 2020 Iowa Democratic caucuses. Gerardo Niemira, the CEO of Shadow Inc., which created the app, stated that technology used by Democrats in prior elections was a "shitshow" and "tangled morass".

Shadow came under scrutiny for its lack of maturity and the means it used to distribute the IowaReporterApp to users. Shadow required iOS device users to use Apple's behind-the-scenes beta-testing infrastructure, TestFlight, while Android users had to use third-party app TestFairy to download the app. Furthermore, a reporter from Motherboard downloaded the app to two Android devices, but it only opened on one of them. The next day, the site published an APK of the app. It also solicited the opinions of various cybersecurity experts. Dan Guido, the head of Trail of Bits, described the app as "hastily thrown together."

Not-for-profit ProPublica commissioned a security audit of the app. It was determined to be "insecure," so an external entity could have hacked it.

The app was reviewed by the Democratic National Committee in advance. David Bergstein said on behalf of the DNC that it was confident that security was being taken "extremely seriously."

Several security and app experts have criticized the amateurish nature of the app. App-development expert, Kasra Rahjerdi, said, "the app was clearly done by someone following a tutorial. It’s similar to projects I do with my mentees who are learning how to code." A team of researchers at Stanford University, including former Facebook chief security officer Alex Stamos, said that while analyzing the app, they found potentially concerning code within it, including hard-coded API keys. The app was written in React Native, authenticated through Auth0, and sent data to Google Cloud Functions.

=== Nevada caucus app ===
The Nevada Democratic Party paid Shadow $58,000 for its caucus reporting app, though it announced it would no longer use it, and instead used Google Forms on iPads.

== Campaign and corporate affiliations ==
Shadow Inc. developed software for the campaigns of numerous Democratic candidates. The Joe Biden, Pete Buttigieg and Kirsten Gillibrand presidential campaigns all made payments to the company. The Buttigieg campaign paid $42,500 to the company in July 2019 for "software rights and subscriptions" for a text-message service. The Biden campaign paid the company $1,225, also for a text-messaging service, while the Gillibrand campaign paid $37,400 to the company for software and fundraising consulting.

The Texas and Wisconsin state Democratic parties also contracted Shadow Inc. for undisclosed services. Shadow Inc. has worked closely with Democratic Party-affiliated companies, including Lockwood Strategy and FWIW Media.

Shadow Inc's parent company Acronym has received large donations from hedge fund managers Seth Klarman and Donald Sussman, venture capitalist Michael Moritz, as well as film directors and producers Jeffrey Katzenberg and Steven Spielberg.
