= 2020 Iowa Democratic presidential caucuses =

- February 3, 2020

49 delegates (41 pledged, 8 unpledged) to the Democratic National Convention The number of pledged delegates won is determined by the number of state delegate equivalents (SDEs) won (Note: The number of pledged national convention delegates is calculated through the number of SDEs won, however, a candidate must get both at least 15% of the total vote to get statewide delegates and at least 15% of the vote in a congressional district to get district delegates from that district. Each precinct has a certain number of SDEs and allocates them based on how many caucus goers there are for each candidate at that precinct. Although calculated delegates were immediately locked to their respective candidate for the first time in the caucus's history, that allocation was only the first step and still needed to be confirmed on district and state conventions, with only candidates still running at the time of the state convention considered for statewide delegates, which made a redistribution of these delegates necessary. District delegates were not allowed to be altered. Differing from this, Buttigieg and Sanders actually retained at least a few of their statewide delegates.)
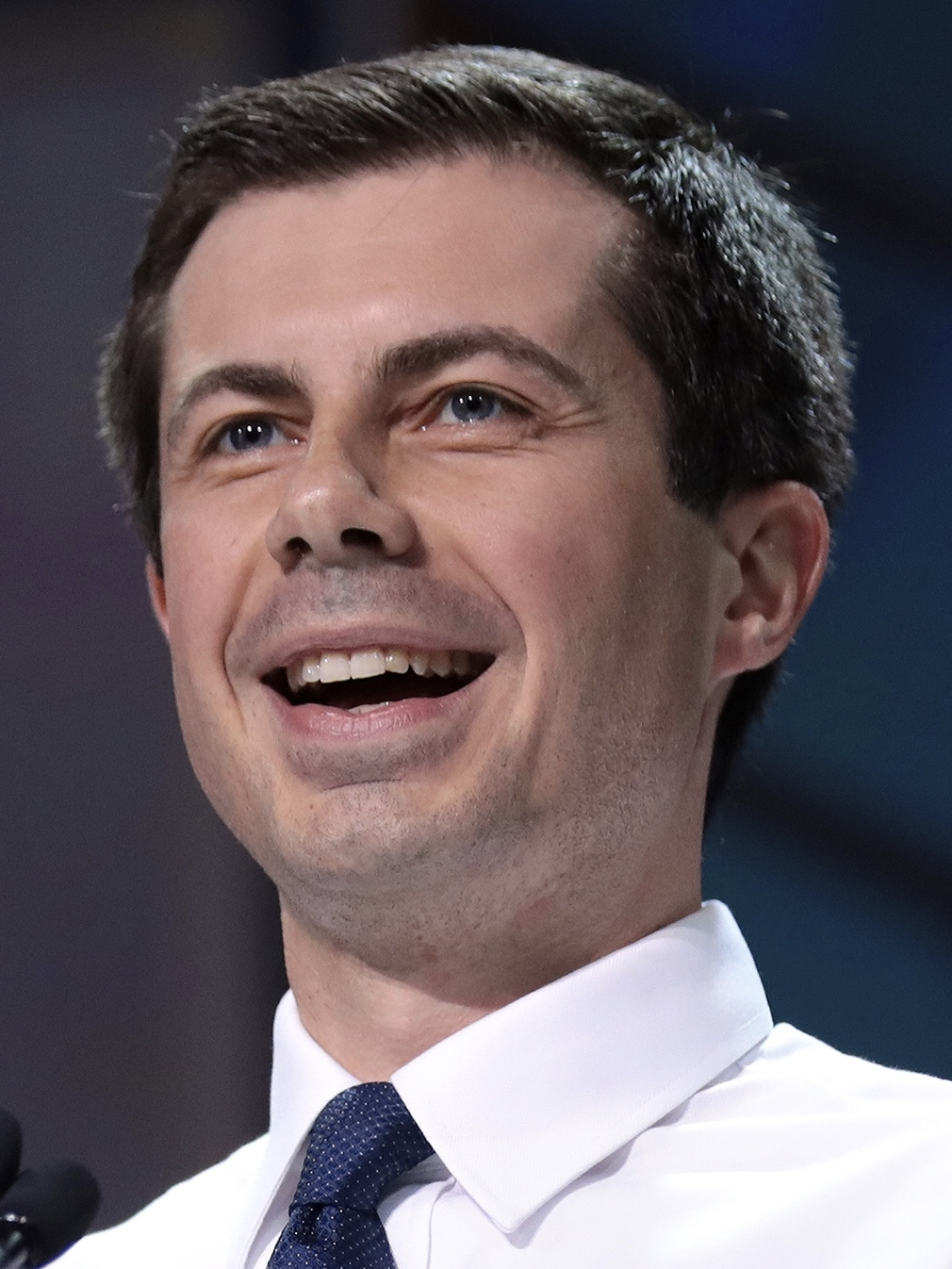

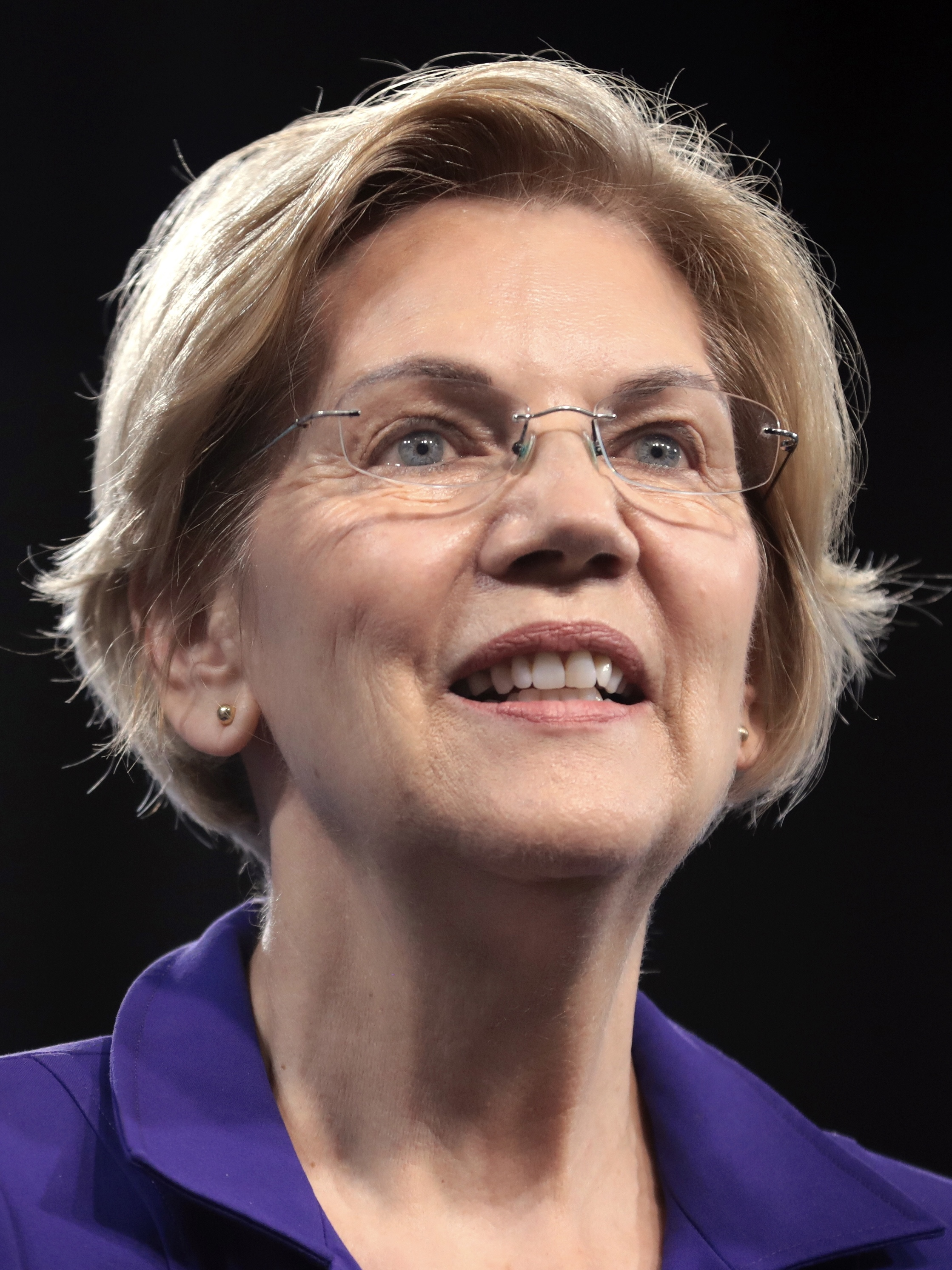

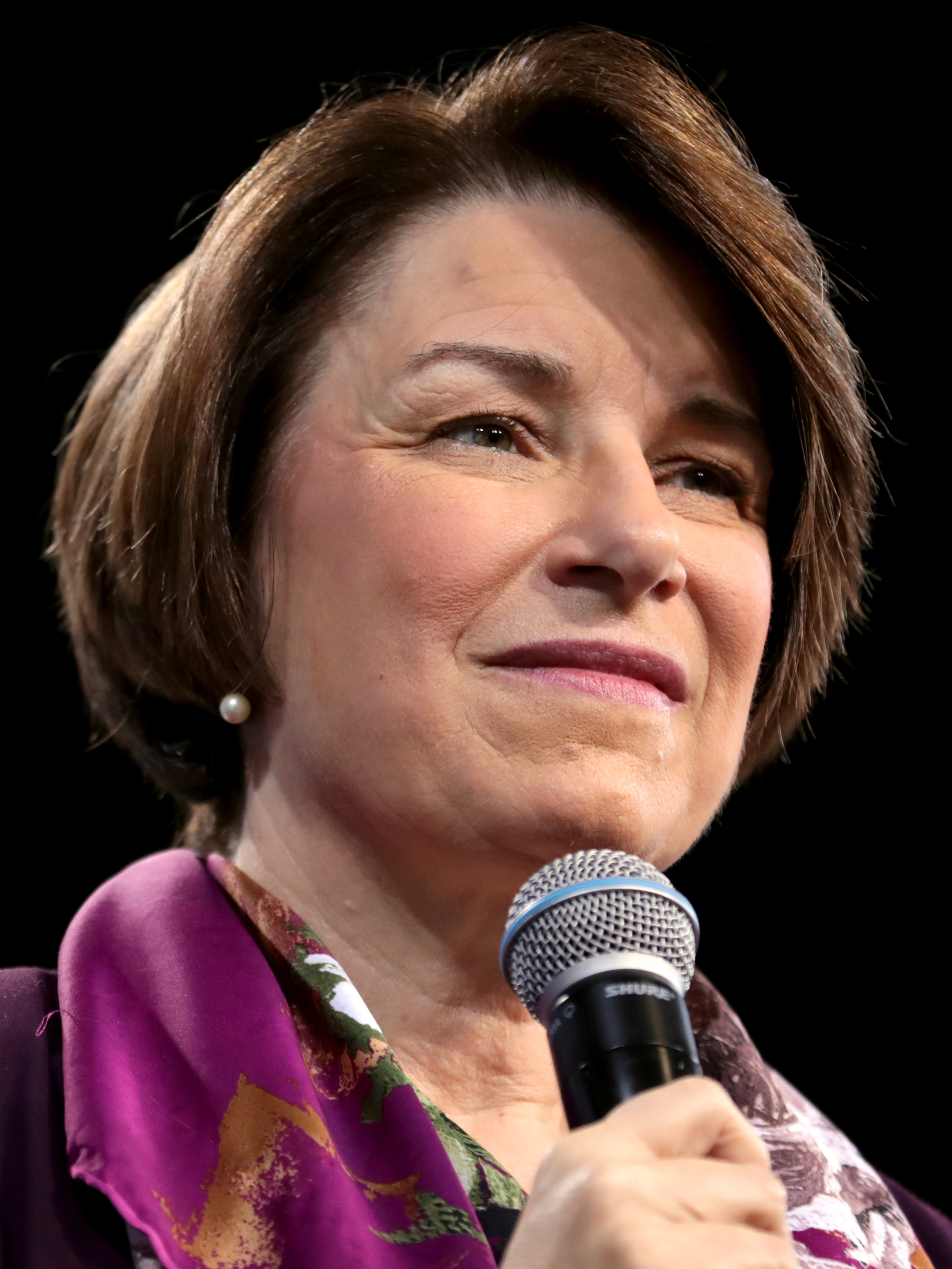

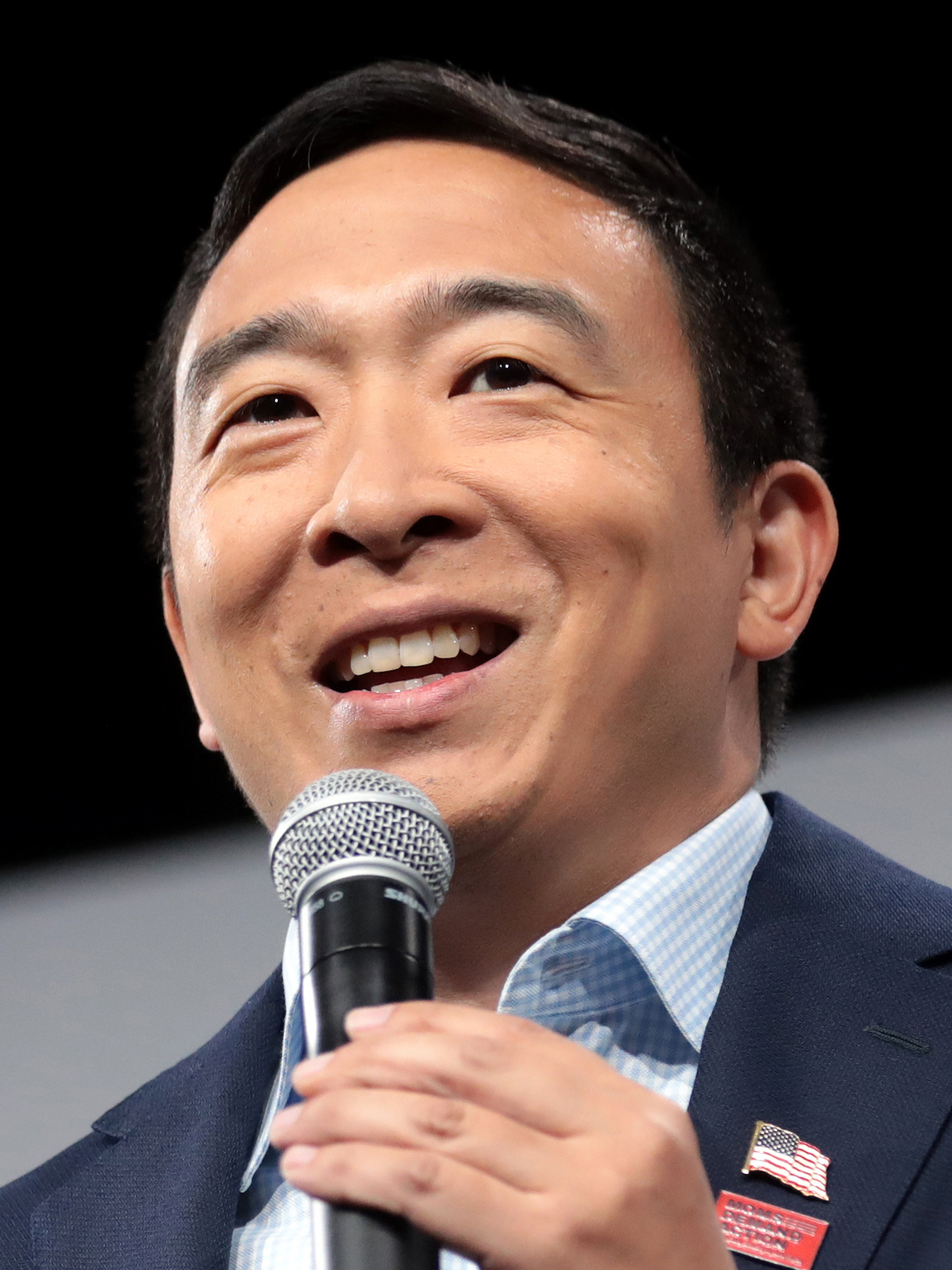
Candidate	Pete Buttigieg	Bernie Sanders	Elizabeth Warren
Home state	Indiana	Vermont	Massachusetts
Delegate count	14 (Note: Due to his withdrawal in March, 2 of the 5 statewide delegates mathematically won by Buttigieg were reallocated to Biden at the state convention on June 13.)	12 (Note: Due to his withdrawal in April, 3 of the 4 statewide delegates mathematically won by Sanders were reallocated to Biden at the state convention on June 13.)	8 (Note: Due to her withdrawal in March, all of the 3 statewide delegates mathematically won by Warren were reallocated to Biden at the state convention on June 13.)
First vote	37,572 (21.3%)	43,581 (24.7%)	32,589 (18.5%)
Final vote	43,209 (25.1%)	45,652 (26.5%)	34,909 (20.3%)
SDEs	563 (26.2%)	562 (26.1%)	388 (18.0%)
Candidate	Joe Biden	Amy Klobuchar	Andrew Yang
Home state	Delaware	Minnesota	New York
Delegate count	6 (Note: 8 of the 12 statewide delegates initially awarded to Buttigieg (2), Sanders (3) and Warren (3), who had withdrawn in the meantime, were reallocated to Biden as the sole remaining viable contender and were added to his own 2 statewide delegates at the state convention on June 13.)	1	0
First vote	26,291 (14.9%)	22,454 (12.7%)	8,914 (5.1%)
Final vote	23,605 (13.7%)	21,100 (12.2%)	1,758 (1.0%)
SDEs	340 (15.8%)	264 (12.3%)	22 (1.0%)

Joe Biden Pete Buttigieg Amy Klobuchar	Bernie Sanders Elizabeth Warren Tie

The 2020 Iowa Democratic presidential caucuses, the first nominating contest in the Democratic Party primaries for the 2020 presidential election, took place on February 3, 2020. Pete Buttigieg received the most state delegate equivalents (SDEs) and therefore the most delegates, with one SDE and two delegates more than Bernie Sanders, who had narrowly won the popular vote with 26.5%, 1.5% ahead of Buttigieg. It was the first time that the Iowa caucuses published the popular vote results of their contest. Buttigieg became the first openly gay person to ever earn the most delegates in a state's presidential contest in the United States. The Iowa caucuses were closed caucuses, wherein only registered members of a party were eligible to vote, and awarded 49 delegates to the 2020 Democratic National Convention, of which 41 were pledged delegates allocated on the basis of the results of the caucuses.

The 2020 Iowa Democratic caucuses were controversial due to the delays in reporting the results. These delays, caused in part by problems with a mobile application created by Shadow Inc. that was used to report voting totals, led to the resignation of Iowa Democratic Party chair Troy Price. Further controversy resulted from errors and inconsistencies regarding the calculation and reporting of State Delegate Equivalents (SDEs) in several caucus locations. Following a three-day delay in vote reporting, the Iowa Democratic Party declared that Buttigieg had won two more delegates than Sanders.

The official result and calculation of pledged national convention delegates was delayed until six days after the election due to the need for a correction of reported results from 3.1% (55) of the precincts. Buttigieg and Sanders then requested a partial recanvass for 8.1% of the official result, which resulted in Buttigieg's lead over Sanders narrowing to 0.08 SDEs. A final recount for 63 of the recanvassed precincts (3.6% of all results) was requested by both campaigns on February 19. Two days later, the Iowa Democratic Party announced that it had accepted recount requests for 23 precincts (1.3% of all results). The recounts took place from February 25 to February 27, with the Iowa Democratic Party announcing the results of the recounts on February 27, 2020. The results were certified by the state committee on February 29. The Associated Press at that point still refused to call a winner due to too many discrepancies in the precinct vote records, though they acknowledged the official results in their delegate count, and Sanders challenged the results after certification before the DNC Rules and Bylaws Committee, but there were no media reports about the outcome of that challenge.

Despite his underperformance, Joe Biden would go on to win the nomination, becoming the first Democratic candidate to do so without winning Iowa since Bill Clinton in 1992. Additionally, with Biden defeating incumbent president Donald Trump in the general election, he became the first candidate to do so without finishing in the top 3 in Iowa since the inception of the caucuses in 1972. The vote counting issues led to Iowa being stripped of their first in the nation position for 2024.

== Procedure ==
As the event was a closed caucus, only Iowans registered as Democrats could vote. However, Iowans who did not register as Democrats before the caucus day could still register as such on caucus night itself at their designated precinct, thereby gaining full voting rights at the event. The votes were cast by physically standing in a section of the caucus site corresponding to the preferred candidate. Proxy voting or absentee voting (i.e. by mail or through participation in a preceding "virtual caucus") was not allowed.

1,678 Iowa precinct caucuses and 87 satellite caucuses around the world (organized as alternative voting sites for registered Democratic Iowans who were unable to vote locally at their precinct caucus) were held, with doors being closed at 7:00 pm CST on February 3, 2020, in order to elect precinct delegates for the subsequent county conventions and allocate the state's 41 pledged national convention delegates based upon the proportional accumulative result of all the precincts.

=== Precinct caucus procedures ===
In all precinct caucuses that elect more than one county convention delegate, the presidential candidates must meet a viability threshold within the individual precinct in order to qualify as a viable candidate. The thresholds are:

- a minimum of 25% for precincts electing only two delegates;
- a minimum of 16.66% for precincts electing only three delegates; (Note: To avoid the repeating fraction, the procedure involves dividing the total number of caucusgoers by 6.) and
- a minimum of 15% for the majority of precincts electing more than three delegates.

After the first round of voting, supporters of viable candidates have their votes locked to their chosen candidate, while the supporters of non‑viable candidates are allowed through a second final round of voting (called realignment) to transfer their vote either to an already‑viable candidate or to a non‑viable group as long as they make it viable. If the number of viable groups formed in the first round or final round exceeds the number of electable county convention delegates in the precinct, then the smallest viable group(s) are forced to realign until the number of viable groups no longer exceeds the number of delegates. Precinct caucuses that elect a single county convention delegate have no viability threshold and thus do not need to go through realignment, but instead elect their single delegate based upon a simple majority vote expressed by the "first alignment" round.

After the final realignment round has ended and the correct maximum number of viable groups formed, then each of those viable groups (supporting a candidate or being uncommitted) elects the county convention delegate(s) their group won according to its proportional percentage share of the qualified votes won after the final alignment in the local precinct. However, due to rounding errors, it is still possible, by following the outlined calculation procedure, that the total number of county convention delegates awarded by the precinct will be higher or lower than the delegate number to which the precinct is entitled. Therefore, as a last correctional step, the viable groups might also gain or lose a delegate depending on the size of their calculated delegate fraction before rounding in order to compensate for the rounding issue. In this last correctional rounding procedure, a special rule ensures that a group can never lose its only county convention delegate won (meaning that a fractional 0.5 delegate calculated to have been won by a group will always be rounded up to one, even when other larger groups are calculated to have higher fractions).

A summary in the table below, display the ratio between state delegate equivalents (SDE's) and county convention delegates (CCD) for all of Iowa's 99 counties. Each county has a different SDE ratio per county convention delegate, with the most populous counties having the highest SDE ratio and the least populous counties having the lowest SDE ratio. The ratio is used when each county converts the results of won county convention delegates into the number of won SDE's. The use of a different ratio in each county mean, that some county convention delegates will be counted to be more worth in SDE-terms compared to their fellow county convention delegates elected in other counties (similar to the principle of the United States Electoral College, where it is possible to win the popular vote without winning the race deciding delegate count).

County convention delegates and SDEs
County	CD	Precincts	CCD	SDE	SDE/CCD ratio
Adair	CD3	5	51	4	0.078
Adams	CD3	5	35	3	0.086
Allamakee	CD1	11	90	7	0.078
Appanoose	CD2	12	75	6	0.080
Audubon	CD4	2	30	3	0.100
Benton	CD1	19	200	15	0.075
Black Hawk	CD1	62	500	101	0.202
Boone	CD4	15	100	19	0.190
Bremer	CD1	13	75	17	0.227
Buchanan	CD1	15	95	13	0.137
Buena Vista	CD4	10	45	9	0.200
Butler	CD4	8	60	7	0.117
Calhoun	CD4	10	60	5	0.083
Carroll	CD4	13	100	11	0.110
Cass	CD3	12	50	6	0.120
Cedar	CD2	12	70	12	0.171
Cerro Gordo	CD4	26	175	31	0.177
Cherokee	CD4	7	55	6	0.109
Chickasaw	CD4	13	100	7	0.070
Clarke	CD2	7	50	4	0.080
Clay	CD4	12	85	8	0.094
Clayton	CD1	14	60	10	0.167
Clinton	CD2	26	140	31	0.221
Crawford	CD4	8	40	6	0.150
Dallas	CD3	34	140	58	0.414
Davis	CD2	8	100	3	0.030
Decatur	CD2	7	85	4	0.047
Delaware	CD1	12	120	9	0.075
Des Moines	CD2	16	75	27	0.360
Dickinson	CD4	15	80	10	0.125
Dubuque	CD1	35	270	72	0.267
Emmet	CD4	11	35	4	0.114
Fayette	CD1	25	100	12	0.120
Floyd	CD4	8	90	10	0.111
Franklin	CD4	12	90	5	0.056
Fremont	CD3	5	40	3	0.075
Greene	CD4	7	50	6	0.120
Grundy	CD4	7	60	6	0.100
Guthrie	CD3	8	70	6	0.086
Hamilton	CD4	8	90	9	0.100
Hancock	CD4	10	50	5	0.100
Hardin	CD4	8	125	9	0.072
Harrison	CD4	13	75	7	0.093
Henry	CD2	9	150	10	0.067
Howard	CD1	9	35	5	0.143
Humboldt	CD4	9	45	4	0.089
Ida	CD4	7	20	3	0.150
Iowa	CD1	11	100	10	0.100
Jackson	CD1	16	70	12	0.171
Jasper	CD2	20	200	23	0.115
Jefferson	CD2	12	55	12	0.218
Johnson	CD2	57	400	162	0.405
Jones	CD1	14	75	12	0.160
Keokuk	CD2	15	35	4	0.114
Kossuth	CD4	20	90	8	0.089
Lee	CD2	22	150	21	0.140
Linn	CD1	86	430	189	0.440
Louisa	CD2	5	50	5	0.100
Lucas	CD2	7	55	4	0.073
Lyon	CD4	8	30	3	0.100
Madison	CD3	9	75	9	0.120
Mahaska	CD2	11	50	8	0.160
Marion	CD2	17	100	18	0.180
Marshall	CD1	19	150	24	0.160
Mills	CD3	11	45	7	0.156
Mitchell	CD1	12	80	6	0.075
Monona	CD4	11	80	4	0.050
Monroe	CD2	7	65	3	0.046
Montgomery	CD3	7	50	4	0.080
Muscatine	CD2	23	150	25	0.167
O'Brien	CD4	9	55	4	0.073
Osceola	CD4	8	30	3	0.100
Page	CD3	8	75	6	0.080
Palo Alto	CD4	6	60	5	0.083
Plymouth	CD4	13	40	9	0.225
Pocahontas	CD4	7	50	3	0.060
Polk	CD3	177	1,401	392	0.280
Pottawattamie	CD3	46	400	48	0.120
Poweshiek	CD1	9	100	14	0.140
Ringgold	CD3	7	80	3	0.038
Sac	CD4	9	60	4	0.067
Scott	CD2	63	300	124	0.413
Shelby	CD4	9	100	5	0.050
Sioux	CD4	16	80	7	0.088
Story	CD4	43	200	83	0.415
Tama	CD1	15	85	11	0.129
Taylor	CD3	7	30	3	0.100
Union	CD3	8	80	6	0.075
Van Buren	CD2	8	30	3	0.100
Wapello	CD2	22	200	18	0.090
Warren	CD3	31	150	35	0.233
Washington	CD2	10	70	13	0.186
Wayne	CD2	4	40	3	0.075
Webster	CD4	28	240	20	0.083
Winnebago	CD4	10	40	6	0.150
Winneshiek	CD1	11	125	16	0.128
Woodbury	CD4	44	240	51	0.213
Worth	CD1	7	75	5	0.067
Wright	CD4	10	45	6	0.133
Total (99 counties)	4	1678	11,402	2,107	0.185

=== Satellite caucus procedures ===
For the first time in the history of the Iowa caucuses, satellite caucuses around the world (60 in-state and 27 out-of-state) were all organized on election day February 3, as alternative voting sites for registered Democratic Iowans who were unable to vote locally at their precinct caucus. The list below display all types of satellite sites (of which most were open for participation of all Iowans, while some were closed caucuses only for those with a private residence or workplace affiliation):

- 14 working-related sites
- 24 student sites on college campuses
- 29 sites accommodating accessibility needs (including aging service centers)
- 11 sites accommodating language and culture needs
- 9 out-of-state sites accommodating Iowans wintering in another state

Doors at most satellite caucuses closed at 7:00 pm CST; while some satellite caucuses however closed doors a few hours earlier or later (between 10 am to 8:30 pm CST of the same day).

Iowa Democrats who are out-of-state on February 3 and want to participate in an out-of-state satellite caucus, as well as those who were in-state but were unable to attend their precinct caucus and therefore have to take part in an early in-state satellite caucus before 6:00 pm CST, all need to pre-register their attendance for these satellite events (including a membership of the Democratic Party) by January 17, 2020. Iowans who instead attend an in-state satellite caucus at 7:00 pm CST or later, however, do not need to pre-register attendance and party membership, as they will be granted the same opportunity as precinct caucusgoers to change their party registration at the door. Those Iowans who participate in any form of satellite caucus will be barred from participating in their designated precinct caucus.

The voting procedure for satellite caucuses was largely identical to the one used for precinct caucuses. However, it differs by the fact that no real county convention delegates are elected; instead, each satellite caucus will be granted a number of "virtual county delegates" depending on the number of caucus attendees:

Number of attendees	1–20	21–40	41–60	61–80	81–100	More than 100
Virtual county delegates	4	5	6	7	8	9

The viability threshold for a group supporting a presidential candidate at a satellite caucus is also set at a minimum of 15%. The calculation rules for allocating "virtual" delegates at a satellite caucus are identical with those used when allocating "real" elected county convention delegates at a precinct caucus.

Accumulated results (number of won virtual county delegates being recalculated to SDEs) of the satellite caucuses are reported from five designated "virtual satellite counties":

- One in each of Iowa's four congressional districts, where the results from all in-state satellite caucuses will be reported and added up within each congressional district.
- One at-large statewide satellite county, where the results from all out-of-state satellite caucuses will be reported and added up.

In addition to the number of precinct elected district and state delegates (elected at the county convention as per the accumulated SDE result of each precinct caucus), each satellite county and their satellite caucuses will also be allocated an additional amount of real district and state delegates (who will not be present at county conventions but only participate in the district convention and state convention).

The available number of the satellite elected district and state delegates will depend on the accumulated voter turnout from all satellite caucuses within respectively each of the four virtual congressional district satellite counties (for in-state satellite caucuses) and within the fifth virtual at-large statewide satellite county (for out-of-state satellite caucuses). Each virtual satellite county will hereby allocate the following number of SDEs among its satellite caucuses:

Virtual congressional district satellite county SDEs (calculated as a percentage of the district SDE base total decided by real precincts)
Total satellite attendance for the CD county	1–600	601–1200	1201–1800	1801–2400	2401–3000	3001–3600	3601–4200	4201–4800	4801–5400	5401 or more
Virtual CD1 satellite county	5.60 SDEs (1%)	11.20 SDEs (2%)	16.80 SDEs (3%)	22.40 SDEs (4%)	28.00 SDEs (5%)	33.60 SDEs (6%)	39.20 SDEs (7%)	44.80 SDEs (8%)	50.40 SDEs (9%)	56.00 SDEs (10%)
Virtual CD2 satellite county	5.43 SDEs (1%)	10.86 SDEs (2%)	16.29 SDEs (3%)	21.72 SDEs (4%)	27.15 SDEs (5%)	32,58 SDEs (6%)	38,01 SDEs (7%)	43.44 SDEs (8%)	48.87 SDEs (9%)	54.30 SDEs (10%)
Virtual CD3 satellite county	5.93 SDEs (1%)	11.86 SDEs (2%)	17.79 SDEs (3%)	23.72 SDEs (4%)	29.65 SDEs (5%)	35.58 SDEs (6%)	41.51 SDEs (7%)	47.44 SDEs (8%)	53.37 SDEs (9%)	59.30 SDEs (10%)
Virtual CD4 satellite county	4.11 SDEs (1%)	8.22 SDEs (2%)	12.33 SDEs (3%)	16.44 SDEs (4%)	20.55 SDEs (5%)	24.66 SDEs (6%)	28.77 SDEs (7%)	32.88 SDEs (8%)	36.99 SDEs (9%)	41.10 SDEs (10%)

Virtual at-large statewide satellite county SDEs (will be allocated in addition to the statewide SDE base total decided by real precincts)
Total satellite attendance for the at-large county	1–500	501–1000	1001–1500	1501–2000	2000 or more
Virtual at-large satellite county	2 SDEs	3 SDEs	4 SDEs	5 SDEs	6 SDEs

The amount of available SDEs to be won in each satellite caucus will be decided based on its proportional allocated share of the "total number of virtual county delegates allocated throughout all satellite caucuses within its own virtual satellite county", which shall be equal to its share of allocated available SDEs within its virtual county.

When the accumulated satellite county SDEs finally gets converted to satellite elected "district and state delegates" for each satellite county as a whole, all presidential candidates having won SDEs within the specific satellite county at a share of less than 15% will have all their SDEs eliminated (meaning they will win 0 district and state delegates), while the remaining qualified presidential candidates having won at least a 15% SDE share within the specific satellite county then finally will win a number of delegates equal to their share of qualified SDEs (with fractions rounded up/down to nearest integers).

As part of the caucus procedures, each satellite caucus will have written down potential candidates among its caucusgoers for the available additional "district and state delegate" positions, later to be selected by the preference of the presidential campaigns to which they have pledged support.

=== County, district, state convention, and national convention delegates ===
Pledged national convention delegates
Type	Del.
CD1 (Note: Each 1st congressional district (CD1)-elected national convention delegate is pledged to support a specific presidential candidate as determined per the total qualified SDE result of the caucuses held only in CD1 on February 3, but the exact name of the CD1 elected national convention delegate will only be selected among the participating "district and state delegates" at the Iowa CD1 District Convention on April 25.)	7
CD2 (Note: Each 2nd congressional district (CD2)-elected national convention delegate is pledged to support a specific presidential candidate as determined per the total qualified SDE result of the caucuses held only in CD2 on February 3, but the exact name of the CD2 elected national convention delegate will only be selected among the participating "district and state delegates" at the Iowa CD2 District Convention on April 25.)	7
CD3 (Note: Each 3rd congressional district (CD3)-elected national convention delegate is pledged to support a specific presidential candidate as determined per the total qualified SDE result of the caucuses held only in CD3 on February 3, but the exact name of the CD3 elected national convention delegate will only be selected among the participating "district and state delegates" at the Iowa CD3 District Convention on April 25.)	8
CD4 (Note: Each 4th congressional district (CD4)-elected national convention delegate is pledged to support a specific presidential candidate as determined per the total qualified SDE result of the caucuses held only in CD4 on February 3, but the exact name of the CD4 elected national convention delegate will only be selected among the participating "district and state delegates" at the Iowa CD4 District Convention on April 25.)	5
PLEO (Note: Each PLEO delegate is pledged to support a specific presidential candidate as determined per the statewide qualified SDE result of the caucuses held on February 3, but the exact name of the PLEO delegate will only be elected among the participating PLEO delegates at the Iowa State Democratic Convention on June 13.)	5
At-large (Note: Each at-large delegate is pledged to support a specific presidential candidate as determined per the statewide qualified SDE result of the caucuses held on February 3, but the exact name of the at-large delegate will only be elected among the participating delegates at the Iowa State Democratic Convention on June 13.)	9
Total pledged delegates	41

A total of 11,402 county convention delegates are elected according to the procedure described above across 1,678 precinct caucuses and 87 satellite caucuses. They will then go to their local county convention on March 21, to choose 2,107 district and state delegates who are pledged to support presidential candidates according to the proportional state delegate equivalents (SDEs) result of the caucuses. These elected districts and state delegates will subsequently go to the district conventions on April 25 (selecting the names of the 27 pledged national convention delegates from the congressional districts) and state convention on June 13 (selecting the names of the remaining statewide elected pledged national convention delegates: nine at-large and five party leaders and elected officials). In total, 41 pledged national convention delegates are elected for the 2020 Democratic National Convention with their pledged support being determined proportionally to the presidential candidate's total number of SDEs won statewide and in each of the state's four congressional districts; but only for those presidential candidates who manage to qualify by winning at least a 15% share of the SDEs statewide or in the specific district. Meaning that all presidential candidates winning less than a 15% share of SDEs statewide and in CD1, CD2, CD3, CD4, will win 0 pledged national convention delegates.

If a presidential candidate based on the statewide caucus result won a number of pledged PLEO delegates or pledged at-large delegates, but then later decides to withdraw as a candidate before the state convention on June 13, their allocation of won pledged PLEO/at-large delegates will then instead be proportionally divided among the other remaining presidential candidates who already managed to qualify with a number of won pledged PLEO/at-large delegates.

The 41 caucus-elected pledged delegates Iowa sends to the national convention are to be joined by eight preselected unpledged PLEO delegates (superdelegates): five members of the Democratic National Committee and three members of Congress (of which all three are U.S. Representatives). The eight superdelegates no longer have the right to cast any decisive vote at the first ballot for determining the Democratic presidential nominee for the presidential election (meaning they can only play a role if allocation of all pledged delegates results in a contested convention); and they are automatically selected independently of the caucus results as unpledged delegates, according to the rules of the Democratic Party.

=== Key changes from previous caucuses ===
In previous caucuses (most recently in 2016), the reported precinct results were used to compute the expected number of pledged national convention delegates according to the state delegate equivalents for each presidential candidate, meaning that the campaigns after the precinct caucuses still needed to hold onto their computed expected pledged national convention delegates as their support were locked to the candidate only at the final step of the selection process (i.e. at the state convention in June). This has changed in the 2020 caucuses, where the computed final number of pledged national convention delegates will be locked to the candidates already when the SDEs result of the precinct caucuses are known.

On February 11, 2019, the Iowa Democratic Party proposed several changes to the procedures used in the previous caucuses, including the addition of a period for "virtual caucuses" from January 29 to February 3, 2020, which would allow participants unable to physically attend the precinct caucuses to join in an online virtual caucus or teleconference in which they will be given the opportunity to rank candidate preferences, with support for non-viable candidates redistributed to viable ones. This process continues until no non-viable choices remain, and the results are aggregated with congressional districts for the purposes of delegate allocation, but limited to 10% SDEs, regardless of the number of those using the virtual caucus option. The results of both the virtual and the precinct caucuses were to be released on the night of February 3, and as a result of rules changes by the national party, raw vote totals for the first and second alignment periods of the caucuses were to be published.

In late August 2019, the DNC ordered both the Iowa and the Nevada Democratic state parties to scrap their plans for "virtual caucuses" due to security concerns.

On September 20, 2019, the DNC conditionally approved a plan for "satellite caucus sites", allowing Iowa Democrats to participate if they are working or going to college outside of the state on February 3, 2020. Eleven of those 87 sites will have Spanish translation services. Latinos made up 6% of the population and 3.4% of registered voters.

The party announced in late January 2020 that a "raw vote count" for both the "first initial alignment" and the "second final alignment" would be reported (along with the computed state delegate equivalents and pledged national convention delegates), for the first time in the history of the caucuses. In previous caucuses, the reported result of the precinct caucuses comprised only the final computed state delegate equivalents and expected number of pledged national convention delegates.

== Polling ==
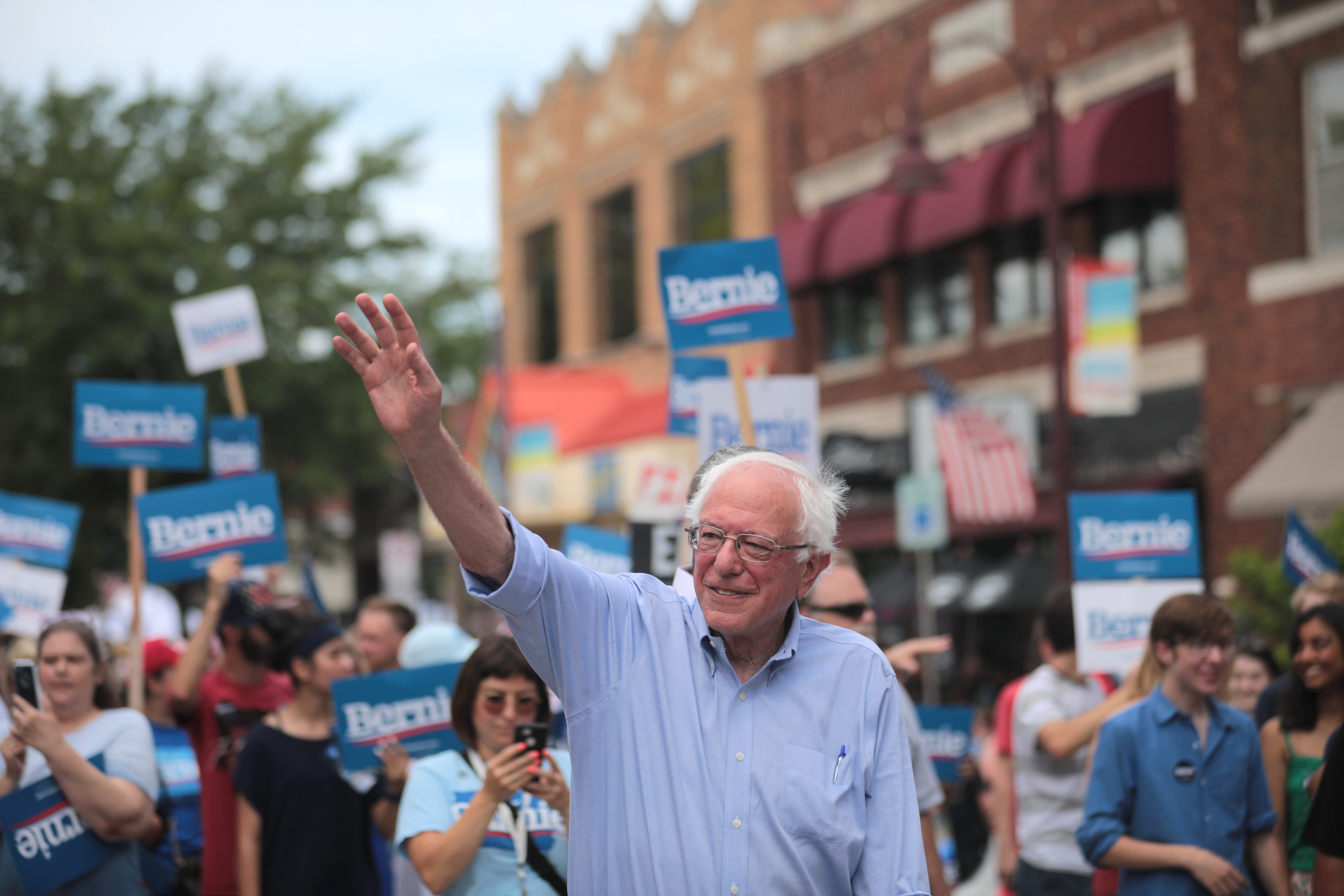
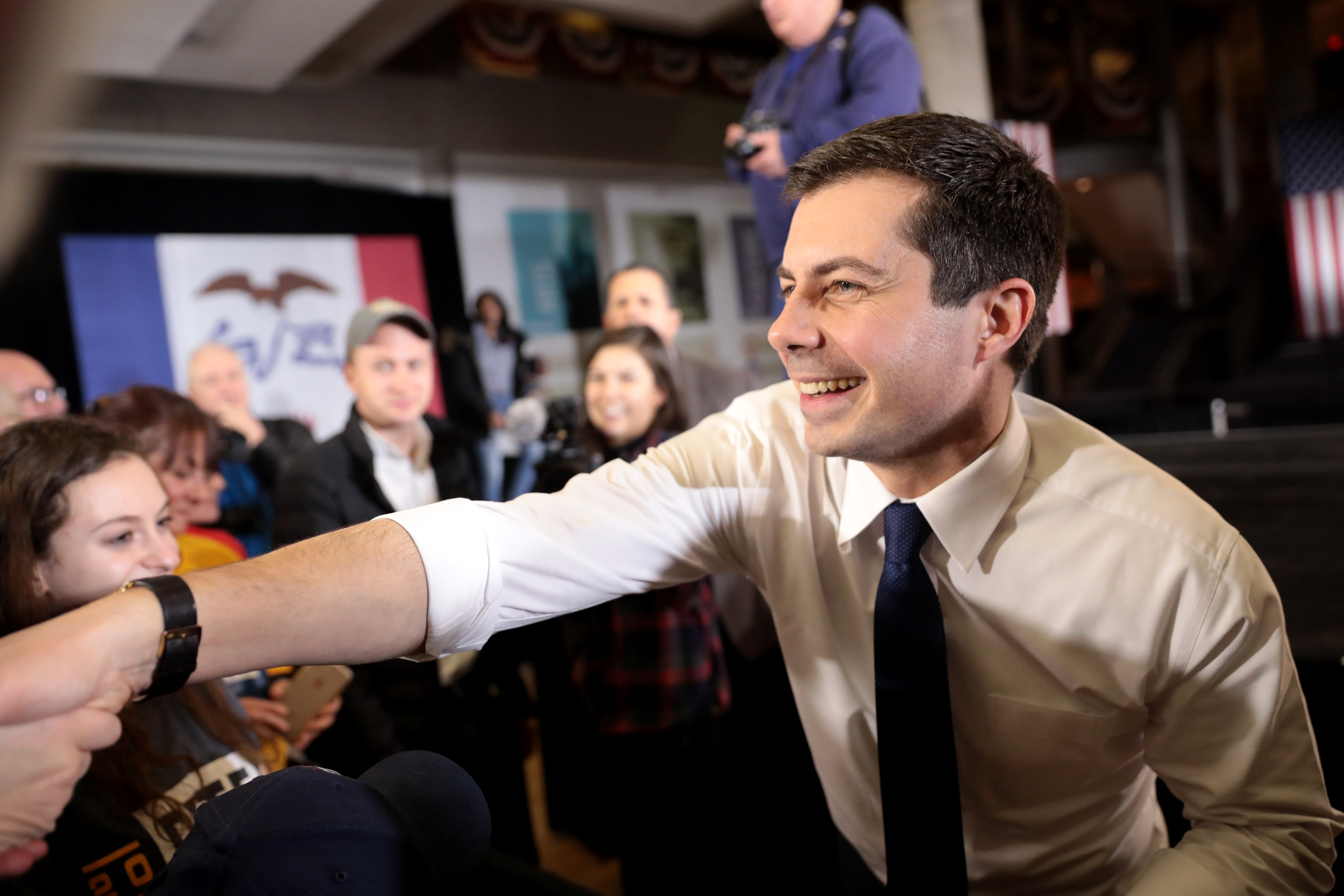
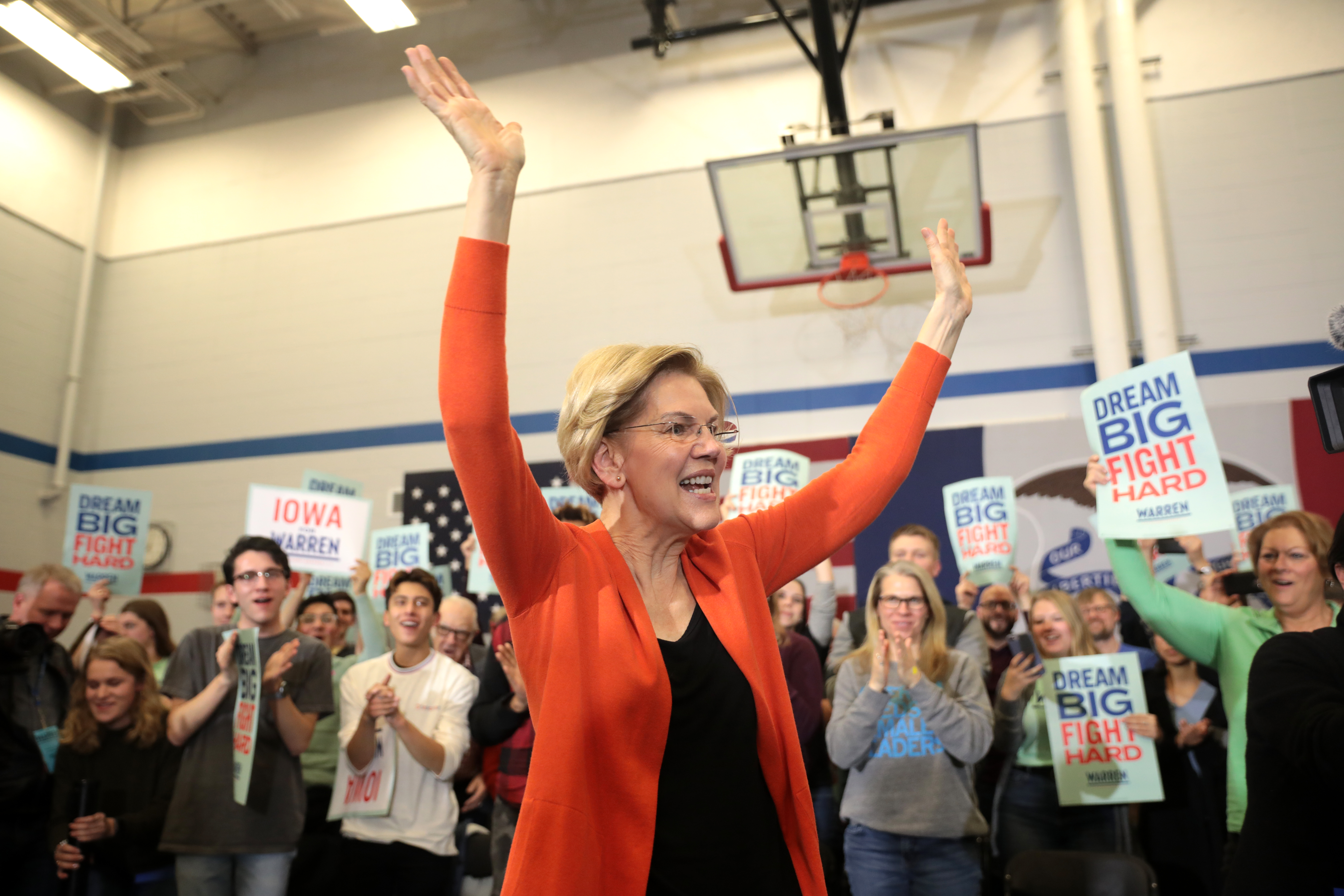
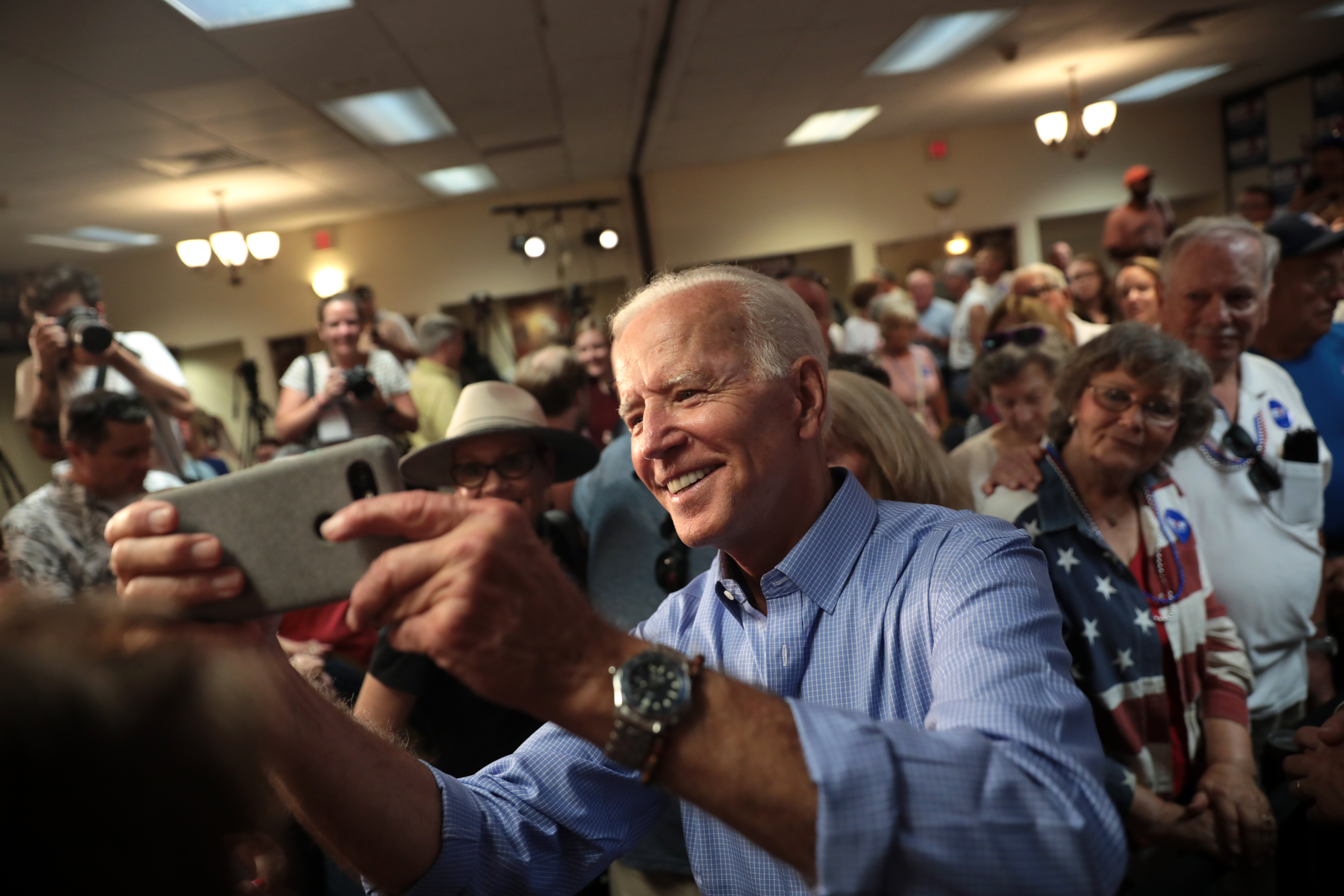
Sanders, Buttigieg, Warren and Biden campaigning in Iowa throughout the lead up to the caucus

Polling aggregation
Source of poll aggregation	Date updated	Dates polled	Bernie Sanders	Joe Biden	Pete Buttigieg	Elizabeth Warren	Amy Klobuchar	Andrew Yang	Tom Steyer	Other	Un- decided (Note: Calculated by taking the difference of 100% and all other candidates combined)
270 to Win	Feb 3, 2020	Jan 22 – Feb 2, 2020	22.6%	18.2%	15.2%	15.6%	11.8%	3.8%	3.6%	3.6% (Note: Gabbard with 1.8%; Bloomberg with 1.3%; Bennet with 0.5%; Patrick not reported)	5.6%
RealClear Politics	Feb 3, 2020	Jan 20 – Feb 2, 2020	23.0%	19.3%	16.8%	15.5%	9.0%	3.3%	3.0%	2.5% (Note: Gabbard with 1.5%; Bloomberg with 1.0%; Bennet and Patrick not reported)	7.6%
FiveThirtyEight	Feb 3, 2020	until Feb 2, 2020 (Note: FiveThirtyEight aggregates polls with a trendline regression of polls rather than a strict average of recent polls.)	22.2%	20.7%	15.7%	14.5%	10.1%	3.7%	3.6%	2.9% (Note: Gabbard and Bloomberg with 1.2%; Bennet with 0.4%; Patrick with 0.1%)	6.6%
Average			22.6%	19.4%	15.9%	15.2%	10.3%	3.6%	3.4%	3.0% (Note: Gabbard with 1.5%; Bloomberg with 1.2%; Bennet with 0.3%; Patrick with 0.0%)	6.6%

The results of a final poll from The Des Moines Register were not released as scheduled on February 1, after an interviewee complained that Pete Buttigieg was not given as a poll option during their interview, with the omission reportedly attributed to human error. As the polling firm was unable to determine whether the mistake was an isolated incident or not, pollster Ann Selzer decided to withhold the results of the poll altogether, marking the first time in 76 years that the final pre-caucus poll was not released by the Register. The poll was later leaked on Twitter, with results confirmed by FiveThirtyEight showing Sanders in the lead with 22%, followed by Warren with 18%, Buttigieg with 16% and Biden with 13%.

Debate qualifying poll as designated by the Democratic National Committee

Polling from December 1, 2019, to February 3, 2020
Poll source	Date(s) administered	Sample size (Note: Key: A – all adults RV – registered voters LV – likely voters V – unclear)	Margin of error	Joe Biden	Pete Buttigieg	Tulsi Gabbard	Amy Klobuchar	Bernie Sanders	Tom Steyer	Elizabeth Warren	Andrew Yang	Other	Undecided
Emerson College	Jan 30 – Feb 2, 2020	853 (LV)	± 3.3%	21%	15%	1%	11%	28%	4%	14%	5%	2%	–
Data for Progress	Jan 28 – Feb 2, 2020	2,394 (LV)	± 1.6%	24% (Note: After reallocation of delegates from candidates estimated to not clear the viability threshold in each precinct)	22%	–	–	28%	–	25%	–	–	–
Data for Progress	Jan 28 – Feb 2, 2020	2,394 (LV)	± 1.6%	18%	18%	2%	9%	22%	4%	19%	6%	2% (Note: Bloomberg with 2%)	–
YouGov/CBS News (MRP)	Jan 22–31, 2020	1,835 (RV)	± 3%	25%	21%	(Note: Data not yet released, but all other candidates each have <5%)	5%	25%		16%			
David Binder Research/Focus on Rural America	Jan 28–30, 2020	300 (LV)	± 5.7%	46% (Note: If the contest came down to Biden and Sanders)	–	–	–	40%	–	–	–	–	14%
David Binder Research/Focus on Rural America	Jan 28–30, 2020	300 (LV)	± 5.7%	15%	19%	3%	11%	17%	3%	15%	1%	2% (Note: Bloomberg and Delaney with 1%; Bennet and Patrick with 0%)	12%
American Research Group	Jan 27–30, 2020	400 (LV)	± 4.0%	17%	9%	2%	16%	23%	3%	15%	5%	4% (Note: Bloomberg with 2%; Bennet and Patrick with 0%; others with 2%)	6%
Civiqs/Data for Progress	Jan 26–29, 2020	615 (LV)	± 4.7%	20% (Note: Re-allocating support to second choice for candidates receiving <15% of first choice votes)	18%	1%	0%	31%	2%	25%	1%	1% (Note: Bennet with 1%; Delaney with 0%)	2%
Civiqs/Data for Progress	Jan 26–29, 2020	615 (LV)	± 4.7%	15%	15%	2%	8%	28%	2%	21%	5%	0% (Note: Bennet and Delaney with 0%)	2%
Park Street Strategies	Jan 24–28, 2020	600 (LV)	± 3.0%	20%	17%	1%	12%	18%	4%	17%	5%	<1% (Note: Bloomberg with <1%)	6%
Monmouth University	Jan 23–27, 2020	544 (LV)	± 4.2%	29% (Note: If only the four candidates listed were viable in the voters' caucus sites)	20%	–	–	25%	–	19%	–	1% (Note: "None of these/won't caucus" with 1%)	6%
Monmouth University	Jan 23–27, 2020	544 (LV)	± 4.2%	22% (Note: If only the six candidates listed were viable in the voters' caucus sites)	17%	–	12%	22%	–	16%	5%	<1% (Note: "None of these/won't caucus" with <1%)	6%
Monmouth University	Jan 23–27, 2020	544 (LV)	± 4.2%	23%	16%	1%	10%	21%	4%	15%	3%	1% (Note: Bennet with 1%; Delaney and Patrick with 0%; other with <1%; "no one" with 0%)	5%
Civiqs/Iowa State University	Jan 23–27, 2020	655 (LV)	± 4.8%	15%	17%	2%	11%	24%	4%	19%	5%	2% (Note: Bloomberg and Delaney with 1%; Bennet and Patrick with 0%)	3% (Note: Reported as "Unsure")
Emerson College	Jan 23–26, 2020	450 (LV)	± 4.6%	21%	10%	5%	13%	30%	5%	11%	5%	2% (Note: Delaney with 1%; Bennet and Patrick with 0%; Someone Else with 1%)	–
Suffolk University/USA Today	Jan 23–26, 2020	500 (LV)	± 4.4%	25.4%	17.6%	0.8%	5.6%	18.6%	2.2%	13.2%	3.0%	13.6% (Note: Patrick with 0.2%; Bennet and Delaney with 0.0%; "Other/Please Specify" with 0.4%; "Don't Know/Refused" with 13%)	–
Change Research/Crooked Media	Jan 22–26, 2020	704 (LV)	± 3.7%	22% (Note: If voters could choose only one of Biden, Buttigieg, Sanders or Warren)	23%	–	–	30%	–	20%	–	–	5%
Change Research/Crooked Media	Jan 22–26, 2020	704 (LV)	± 3.7%	18%	19%	1%	10%	27%	4%	15%	4%	2% (Note: Delaney and Patrick with 1%; Bennet with 0%)	–
Siena College/New York Times	Jan 20–23, 2020	584 (LV)	± 4.8%	23% (Note: If the field is narrowed to these top four candidates)	23%	–	–	30%	–	19%	–	–	8% (Note: Listed as "don't know/refused")
Siena College/New York Times	Jan 20–23, 2020	584 (LV)	± 4.8%	17%	18%	1%	8%	25%	3%	15%	3%	1% (Note: Bloomberg with 1%; Bennet, Delaney, and Patrick with 0%)	8%
Morningside College	Jan 17–23, 2020	253 (LV)	± 6.2%	19%	18%	3%	12%	15%	6%	15%	4%	2% (Note: Bennet, Bloomberg and Delaney with 1%; Patrick with 0%)	4%
YouGov/CBS News	Jan 16–23, 2020	1401 (RV)	± 3.9%	25%	22%	0%	7%	26%	1%	15%	1%	2% (Note: Delaney with 1%; Bennet and Patrick with 0%; someone else with 1%)	1%
Civiqs/Data for Progress	Jan 19–21, 2020	590 (LV)	± 4.8%	17%	19%	2%	6%	24%	3%	19%	5%	0% (Note: Bennet and Delaney with 0%)	5%
David Binder Research/Focus on Rural America	Jan 15–18, 2020	500 (LV)	± 4.4%	24%	16%	1%	11%	14%	4%	18%	3%	2% (Note: Bennet and Bloomberg with 1%; Delaney and Patrick with 0%)	–
Neighbourhood Research and Media/Breitbart	Jan 14–17, 2020	300 (LV)	± 4.8%	23%	17%	– (Note: Not listed separately from "others")	11%	10%	2%	15%	2%	6% (Note: Trump with 5%; "others" with 2%)	13%
	Jan 13, 2020	Booker withdraws from the race											
Monmouth University	Jan 9–12, 2020	405 (LV)	± 4.9%	28% (Note: If the only viable candidates to caucus for were the four listed in this poll)	25%	–	–	24%	–	16%	–	2% (Note: "None of these/wouldn't vote" with 2%)	4%
Monmouth University	Jan 9–12, 2020	405 (LV)	± 4.9%	24%	17%	2%	8%	18%	4%	15%	4%	4% (Note: Booker with 4%, Bennet and Delaney with <1%, Patrick with 0%, Other with <1%)	5%
Selzer/CNN/Des Moines Register	January 2–8, 2020	701 (LV)	± 3.7%	15%	16%	2%	6%	20%	2%	17%	5%	2% (Note: Booker with 3%; Bloomberg with 1%; Bennet, Castro, Delaney, Patrick and Williamson with 0%; someone else with 1%)	11%
YouGov/CBS News	Dec 27, 2019 – Jan 3, 2020	953 (RV)	± 3.8%	23%	23%	1%	7%	23%	2%	16%	2%	2% (Note: Booker with 2%; Bennet, Castro, Delaney, Patrick and Williamson with 0%; someone else with 1%)	1%
KG Polling	Dec 19–23, 2019	750 (LV)	± 3.8%	24%	12%	–	5%	31%	–	13%	10%	–	5% (Note: Includes "refused")
Civiqs/Iowa State University	Dec 12–16, 2019	632 (LV)	± 4.9%	15%	24%	3%	4%	21%	2%	18%	3%	4% (Note: Booker with 3%; Castro with 1%; Delaney, Bloomberg, Bennet, Williamson with 0%)	4%
Emerson College	Dec 7–10, 2019	325 (LV)	± 5.4%	23%	18%	2%	10%	22%	3%	12%	2%	8% (Note: Booker with 4%; Bloomberg with 2%; Bennet, Castro, Delaney, Patrick and Williamson with 0%; someone else with 2%)	–
	Dec 3, 2019	Harris withdraws from the race											

Polling during November 2019
Poll source	Date(s) administered	Sample size	Margin of error	Joe Biden	Pete Buttigieg	Tulsi Gabbard	Kamala Harris	Amy Klobuchar	Bernie Sanders	Tom Steyer	Elizabeth Warren	Andrew Yang	Other	Undecided
Civiqs/Iowa State University	Nov 15–19, 2019	614 (LV)	± 4.9%	12%	26%	2%	2%	5%	18%	2%	19%	4%	6% (Note: Bennet, Bloomberg, Booker, Bullock, Castro and Williamson with 1%; Delaney, Messam, Patrick and Sestak with 0%)	3%
Des Moines Register/CNN	Nov 8–13, 2019	500 (LV)	± 4.4%	15%	25%	3%	3%	6%	15%	3%	16%	3%	6% (Note: Booker with 3%; Bloomberg with 2%; Bennet with 1%; Bullock, Castro, Delaney, Sestak and Williamson with 0%; none with 2%)	5%
YouGov/CBS News	Nov 6–13, 2019	856 (RV)	± 4.1%	22%	21%	0%	5%	5%	22%	2%	18%	1%	4% (Note: Booker, Bullock, and Castro with 1%, Messam, Delaney, Bennet, Williamson, and Sestak with 0%, "Someone else" with 1%)	–
Monmouth University	Nov 7–11, 2019	451 (LV)	± 4.6%	19%	22%	2%	3%	5%	13%	3%	18%	3%	6% (Note: Booker with 2%; Bullock and Castro with 1%; Bennet, Bloomberg, Delaney, and Williamson with <1%; Sestak with 0%)	8%
University of Iowa	Oct 28 – Nov 10, 2019	465 (LV)	± 4.6%	15%	16%	3%	2%	1%	18%	3%	23%	3%	2% (Note: Castro with 1%; Bennet, Booker, Bullock, Delaney, O'Rourke and Ryan with 0%)	13%
Public Policy Polling	Nov 5–6, 2019	715 (LV)	–	13%	20%	–	3%	9%	14%	6%	21%	3%	–	10%
Quinnipiac University	Oct 30 – Nov 5, 2019	698 (LV)	± 4.5%	15%	19%	3%	4%	5%	17%	3%	20%	3%	4% (Note: Bennett, Booker, Bullock and Castro with 1%; Delaney, Messam, Sestak and Williamson with 0%)	8%
	Nov 1, 2019	O'Rourke withdraws from the race												

Polling before November 2019
Poll source	Date(s) administered	Sample size	Margin of error	Joe Biden	Cory Booker	Pete Buttigieg	Kamala Harris	Amy Klobuchar	Beto O'Rourke	Bernie Sanders	Elizabeth Warren	Other	Undecided
Siena College/New York Times	Oct 25–30, 2019	439 (LV)	± 4.7%	17%	2%	18%	3%	4%	1%	19%	22%	8% (Note: Yang with 3%; Gabbard and Steyer with 2%; Delaney with 1%; Bennet, Bullock, Castro, Messam, Sestak and Williamson with 0%)	6%
Civiqs/Iowa State University	Oct 18–22, 2019	598 (LV)	± 5%	12%	1%	20%	3%	4%	1%	18%	28%	8% (Note: Steyer with 3%; Gabbard and Yang with 2%; Bennet with 1%; Bullock, Castro, Delaney, Ryan and Williamson with 0%; Messam and Sestak with no voters (Note: As evidenced by Sestak being listed in second choices but not first preferences and the lack of an 'other' column in the first preferences topline))	4%
Suffolk University/USA Today	Oct 16–18, 2019	500 (LV)	± 4.4%	18%	1%	13%	3%	3%	1%	9%	17%	7% (Note: Gabbard and Steyer with 3%; Yang with 1%; Delaney, Ryan and Williamson with 0%; Bennet, Bullock, Castro, Messam and Sestak with no voters; refused with 0%)	29%
Emerson College	Oct 13–16, 2019	317 (LV)	± 5.5%	23%	3%	16%	2%	1%	0%	13%	23%	15% (Note: Yang with 5%; Bullock with 4%; Gabbard and Steyer with 2%; Bennet and Williamson with 1%; Castro with 0%; Delaney, Messam, Ryan and Sestak with no voters; everyone else with 4%)	–
Firehouse Strategies/Øptimus	Oct 8–10, 2019	548 (LV)	± 3.6%	22%	2%	17%	3%	– (Note: The poll did not announce this result separately; it is listed as part of 'Other'.)	1%	5%	25%	26% (Note: Yang with 1%; a different Democratic candidate, don't know, or refused with 25%)	–
YouGov/CBS News	Oct 3–11, 2019	729 (RV)	± 4.6%	22%	2%	14%	5%	2%	2%	21%	22%	7% (Note: Steyer with 3%; Bennet, Gabbard, Williamson, and Ryan with 1%, Bullock, Castro, Delaney, Messam, Sestak, and Yang with 0%; "someone else" with 0%)	–
Selzer/CNN/Des Moines Register	Sep 14–18, 2019	602 (LV)	± 4.0%	20%	3%	9%	6%	3%	2%	11%	22%	11% (Note: Gabbard, Steyer, and Yang with 2%, Bullock, Castro, and Delaney with 1%, Bennet, de Blasio, Ryan, Sestak, and Williamson with 0%; "none of these" with 2%)	14%
David Binder Research	Sep 14–17, 2019	500 (LV)	± 4.4%	25%	2%	12%	5%	8%	1%	9%	23%	9% (Note: Steyer with 3%; Yang with 2%; Bullock, Castro, Delaney and Gabbard with 1%; Bennet, de Blasio, Messam, Ryan, Sestak and Williamson with 0%)	6%
Civiqs/Iowa State University	Sep 13–17, 2019	572 (LV)	± 5.2%	16%	2%	13%	5%	3%	2%	16%	24%	11% (Note: Gabbard with 4%; Yang with 3%; Steyer with 2%; Ryan and Williamson with 1%; Bennet, de Blasio, Bullock, Castro and Delaney with 0%)	8%
YouGov/CBS News	Aug 28 – Sep 4, 2019	835	± 4.3%	29%	2%	7%	6%	2%	2%	26%	17%	9% (Note: Steyer with 2%; Castro, de Blasio, Delaney, Gabbard and Yang with 1%; Bennet, Bullock, Messam, Ryan, Sestak and Williamson with 0%; someone else with 2%)	–
Change Research	Aug 9–11, 2019	621 (LV)	± 3.9%	17%	3%	13%	8%	2%	3%	17%	28%	9% (Note: Bullock, Gabbard, and Steyer with 2%; Bennet, Castro, and Yang with 1%; Delaney, Gillibrand, Hickenlooper, Messam, and Williamson with 0%)	–
Monmouth University	Aug 1–4, 2019	401 (LV)	± 4.9%	28%	1%	8%	11%	3%	<1%	9%	19%	11% (Note: Steyer with 3%; Gillibrand and Yang with 2%; Bullock, Delaney, Gabbard, and Hickenlooper with 1%; Bennet, Castro, Inslee, O'Rourke, and Williamson with <1%; de Blasio, Messam, Moulton, Ryan, and Sestak with 0%)	10%
Firehouse Strategies/Øptimus	Jul 23–25, 2019	630	± 3.3%	23%	2%	7%	12%	–	2%	11%	23%	4%	16%
YouGov/CBS News	Jul 9–18, 2019	706	± 4.4%	24%	3%	7%	16%	4%	1%	19%	17%	9% (Note: Castro and Steyer with 2%; Delaney, Gillibrand, Hickenlooper, and Sestak with 1%; Bennet, Bullock, de Blasio, Gabbard, Gravel, Inslee, Messam, Moulton, Ryan, Williamson, and Yang with 0%)	–
	Jul 9, 2019	Steyer announces his candidacy											
Change Research	Jun 29 – Jul 4, 2019	420 (LV)	–	16%	1%	25%	16%	1%	2%	16%	18%	5% (Note: Castro, Delaney, Gabbard, Gillibrand, Inslee, Swalwell, and Yang with 1%; Bennet, Bullock, Gravel, Hickenlooper, Moulton, Ryan, and Williamson with 0%)	–
David Binder Research	Jun 29 – Jul 1, 2019	600	± 4.0%	17%	2%	10%	18%	4%	1%	12%	20%	9% (Note: Bennet, Bullock, Castro, de Blasio, Delaney, Gabbard, Gillibrand, Williamson, and Yang with 1%; Hickenlooper, Inslee, Ryan, and Swalwell with <1%; Messam and Moulton with 0%; others with <1%)	9%
Suffolk University/USA Today	Jun 28 – Jul 1, 2019	500	± 4.4%	24%	2%	6%	16%	2%	1%	9%	13%	6% (Note: Bennet, Castro, Delaney, Gabbard, and Yang with 1%; Bullock, de Blasio, Gillibrand, Gravel, Hickenlooper, Inslee, Messam, Moulton, Ryan, Sestak, Swalwell, and Williamson with 0%; others with 1%)	21%
Change Research	Jun 17–20, 2019	308 (LV)	–	27%	5%	17%	4%	2%	1%	18%	20%	7% (Note: Delaney with 2%; Castro, Gabbard, Gravel, Moulton, and Yang with 1%; Bullock, de Blasio, Gillibrand, Hickenlooper, Inslee, Messam, Ryan, Swalwell, and Williamson with 0%)	–
Selzer/CNN/Des Moines Register	Jun 2–5, 2019	600	± 4.0%	24%	1%	14%	7%	2%	2%	16%	15%	6% (Note: Bennet, Castro, Delaney, Gabbard, Inslee, and Yang with 1%; Bullock, Gillibrand, Hickenlooper, Moulton, Ryan, Swalwell, and Williamson with <1%; de Blasio and Messam with 0%)	6%
Change Research	May 15–19, 2019	615 (LV)	± 3.9%	24%	1%	14%	10%	2%	5%	24%	12%	9% (Note: Yang with 2%; Abrams, Delaney, Gabbard, Gillibrand, Hickenlooper, Inslee, and Swalwell with 1%; Bennet, Bullock, Castro, Ryan, and Williamson with 0%)	–
Firehouse Strategies/Øptimus	Apr 30 – May 2, 2019	576	± 4.1%	35%	2%	11%	5%	4%	3%	14%	10%	–	16%
	Apr 25, 2019	Biden announces his candidacy											
Gravis Marketing	Apr 17–18, 2019	590	± 4.0%	19%	4%	14%	6%	4%	5%	19%	6%	7% (Note: Delaney with 2%; Gabbard, Gillibrand, Gravel, Hickenlooper, and Yang with 1%; Castro and Inslee with 0%)	16%
	Apr 14, 2019	Buttigieg announces his candidacy											
Monmouth University	Apr 4–9, 2019	351	± 5.2%	27%	3%	9%	7%	4%	6%	16%	7%	7% (Note: Castro with 2%; Delaney, Gillibrand, Ryan, Swalwell, and Yang with 1%; Bullock, de Blasio, Gabbard, and Inslee with <1%; Bennet, Hickenlooper, McAuliffe, Messam, Moulton, and Williamson with 0%)	12%
David Binder Research	Mar 21–24, 2019	500	± 4.4%	25%	7%	6%	9%	6%	6%	17%	8%	9% (Note: Delaney with 3%; Castro, Gabbard, Gillibrand, Inslee, Swalwell, and Yang with 1%; Bullock, Hickenlooper, and Williamson with <1%; Bennet and McAuliffe with 0%; others with <1%)	7%
Emerson College	Mar 21–24, 2019	249	± 6.2%	25%	6%	11%	10%	2%	5%	24%	9%	8% (Note: Castro, Gabbard, Hickenlooper, and Inslee with 1%; Gillibrand and Yang with 0%; others with 4%)	–
Public Policy Polling (D) (Note: Poll sponsored by End Citizens United)	Mar 14–15, 2019	678	–	29%	4%	–	5%	6%	7%	15%	8%	4%	22%
	Mar 14, 2019	O'Rourke announces his candidacy											
Selzer/CNN/Des Moines Register	Mar 3–6, 2019	401	± 4.9%	27%	3%	1%	7%	3%	5%	25%	9%	5% (Note: Bennet, Bullock, Castro, Delaney, and Inslee with 1%; Bloomberg, de Blasio, Gabbard, Gillibrand, Hickenlooper, Holder, Swalwell, Williamson, and Yang with <1%)	10%
	Feb 19, 2019	Sanders announces his candidacy											
	Feb 10, 2019	Klobuchar announces her candidacy											
	Feb 9, 2019	Warren announces her candidacy											
Firehouse Strategies/Øptimus	Jan 31 – Feb 2, 2019	558	± 3.6%	25%	4%	–	17%	5%	4%	10%	11%	1% (Note: Gillibrand with 1%)	25%
Emerson College	Jan 30 – Feb 2, 2019	260	± 6.0%	29%	4%	0%	18%	3%	6%	15%	11%	15% (Note: Brown with 4%; Castro with 2%; Delaney and Gillibrand with 1%; Gabbard and Yang with 0%; others with 8%)	–
	Feb 1, 2019	Booker announces his candidacy											
	Jan 21, 2019	Harris announces her candidacy											
	Jan 11, 2019	Gabbard announces her candidacy											
Change Research	Dec 13–17, 2018	1,291 (LV)	–	20%	4%	–	7%	5%	19%	20%	7%	18% (Note: Kennedy with 5%; Clinton with 4%; Brown with 2%; Bloomberg, Castro, Cuomo, Delaney, Gillibrand, Kerry, and Swalwell with 1%; Holder, McAuliffe, Schultz, and Steyer with 0%)	–
Selzer/CNN/Des Moines Register	Dec 10–13, 2018	455	± 4.6%	32%	4%	–	5%	3%	11%	19%	8%	7% (Note: Bloomberg with 3%; Brown, Castro, Delaney, and Hickenlooper with 1%; Bullock, Garcetti, Gillibrand, Holder, Inslee, Steyer, Swalwell, and Yang with <1%)	6%
David Binder Research	Dec 10–11, 2018	500	± 4.4%	30%	6%	–	7%	10%	11%	13%	9%	8% (Note: Brown with 3%; Bloomberg and Kerry with 2%; Delaney with 1%; Garcetti with 0%; others with <1%)	6%
David Binder Research	Sep 20–23, 2018	500	± 4.4%	37%	8%	–	10%	–	–	12%	16%	6% (Note: Gillibrand and Holder with 2%; Avenatti and Delaney with 1%; Bullock, Garcetti, Landrieu, and Patrick with <1%; others with 1%)	9%
	Nov 6, 2017	Yang announces his candidacy											
Public Policy Polling (D) (Note: Poll sponsored by O'Say Can You See PAC, the PAC that supported O'Malley in 2016)	Mar 3–6, 2017	1,062	–	–	17%	–	3%	11%	–	–	–	34% (Note: O'Malley with 18%; Cuomo with 8%; Castro and Sandberg with 4%; Gillibrand with 3%; Schultz with 1%)	32%

== Results ==
Final alignment popular vote share by county
Buttigieg—<30%
Buttigieg—30–40%
Buttigieg—40–50%
Sanders—<30%
Sanders—30–40%
Sanders—50–60%
Warren—<30%
Warren—30–40%
Biden—<30%
Biden—30–40%
Klobuchar—<30%
Klobuchar—30–40%

Final alignment popular vote share by congressional district
Buttigieg—<30%
Sanders—<30%

Candidate vote shares

Neither the final statewide total of "initial alignment votes" nor "final alignment votes" were used to determine the statewide number of "state delegate equivalents" (SDEs) won. Instead, a number of SDEs can be won in each of the 1,678 precinct caucuses and 87 satellite caucuses based upon the final alignment votes in each specific precinct. The number of "pledged national convention delegates" was determined proportionally to the candidate's total number of SDEs won statewide and in each of the state's four congressional districts, but only for those candidates who won more than a 15.0% share of the SDEs statewide or in the specific district.

On the evening of February 6, after a three-day delay for all precinct votes to be reported, the first preliminary count for statewide results was published by the Iowa Democratic Party, which found that Pete Buttigieg had narrowly won the state delegate equivalent (SDE) count over Bernie Sanders, while Sanders won the popular vote on both the first and final caucus alignments (after supporters of non-viable candidates below the 15% threshold redistributed their support to viable ones). Due to various journalists identifying a number of potential errors in the reported vote total and calculated state delegate equivalents, and due to the Democratic National Committee (DNC) suggesting a recanvass of the results would be needed, some major news organizations refused to declare a winner until completion of a possible recanvass or recount.

On the evening of February 9, the Iowa Democratic Party (IDP) had (through their own conducted initial audit of the first preliminary count of statewide results) found the need to correct some incorrectly reported results from 3.1% (55) of the precincts. The corrected result was published as the first final official result before certification (meaning before conducting a formal potential recanvass/recount). The IDP also calculated the number of won pledged national convention delegates on the same basis. The deadline for campaigns to request a recanvass or recount of the results was extended from February 7 to February 10, giving campaigns three additional days to review the results and decide whether they want to challenge them, which both the Sanders campaign and the Buttigieg campaign did for 8.1% (143) of the precincts/satellite sites.

The IDP accepted both partial recanvass requests on February 12, and carried out the recanvass from February 16–18 after the campaigns agreed to bear the costs. The recanvass was an audit to check if the initial reporting of figures concurred with the figures displayed on the math worksheet of the voting site. In order to correct the observed mathematical errors on several math worksheets, which were initially signed by all caucus group captains at the respective local voting sites, a subsequent recount process also needed to be called after the conclusion of the recanvass process.

On February 18, the post-recanvass SDE count was released, with Buttigieg leading Sanders by 0.08 SDEs. The following day, the Buttigieg and Sanders campaigns requested a final recount for 63 of the recanvassed precincts (3.6% of all results). On February 21, the IDP announced that it had accepted recount requests for 23 precincts (1.3% of all results). It announced it would recount all 10 precincts requested by the Sanders campaign and 14 of the 54 precincts requested by the Buttigieg campaign, stating it rejected the Buttigieg request to recount the remaining 40 precincts because the campaign had failed to demonstrate that a potential recount of those precincts could result in a different SDE result. The recount began on February 25 and was completed over the following two days. On February 27, the IDP concluded the official recount, resulting in Buttigieg maintaining a slight edge over Sanders in SDEs. Sanders challenged the results of the Iowa caucuses; as of February 29, 2020, that challenge was pending before the Democratic National Committee's Rules and Bylaws Committee, but there were no media reports about how the matter was dealt with or about any following decisions.

2020 Iowa Democratic presidential caucuses
Candidate	Initial alignment		Final alignment (Note: Final vote after votes for candidates below the 15% viability threshold in each precinct are reallocated to other viable candidates.)		State delegate equivalents (Note: The official results included four decimal digits.)		Pledged national convention delegates (Note: In Iowa, the presidential caucuses only are the first determining step for the delegate distribution, the final step are the decisions on the district conventions and the much later state convention. According to the provisions set by the Iowa Democratic Party's "Delegate Selection Plan", statewide delegates preliminarily awarded to other candidates had to be reallocated at the state convention on June 13, as their pledged candidates had dropped out, while the already early decided district delegates remain fixed.)
Candidate	Votes	%	Votes	%	Number	%	Pledged national convention delegates
Pete Buttigieg	37,572	21.31	43,209	25.08	562.95	26.17	14
Bernie Sanders	43,581	24.71	45,652	26.50	562.02	26.13	12
Elizabeth Warren	32,589	18.48	34,909	20.26	388.44	18.06	8
Joe Biden	26,291	14.91	23,605	13.70	340.32	15.82	6
Amy Klobuchar	22,454	12.73	21,100	12.25	263.87	12.27	1
Andrew Yang	8,914	5.05	1,758	1.02	21.86	1.02	
Tom Steyer	3,061	1.74	413	0.24	6.62	0.31	
Michael Bloomberg (did not run yet) (Note: Michael Bloomberg officially announced his candidacy for the Democratic nomination on November 24, 2019, but chose not to contest the first four nominating contests of the primary season, including the Iowa caucuses.)	212	0.12	16	0.01	0.21	0.01	
Tulsi Gabbard	341	0.19	16	0.01	0.11	0.01	
Michael Bennet	164	0.09	4	0.00	0.00	0.00	
Deval Patrick	9	0.01	0	0.00	0.00	0.00	
John Delaney (withdrawn)	0	0.00	0	0.00	0.00	0.00	
Other	155	0.09	198	0.11	0.69	0.03	
Uncommitted	1,009	0.57	1,420	0.82	3.73	0.17	
Total (Note: Per the Iowa Democratic Party official report.)	176,352	100%	172,300	100%	2,150.83	100%	41

Participation in the 2020 caucuses (176,352 initial alignment votes in the official count) was slightly higher than the 171,517 people who participated in the 2016 caucuses, but still 26% lower compared to the over 239,000 people who participated in the 2008 caucuses.

Sanders won the popular vote on both the initial and the final alignments. Former Vice President Joe Biden had a particularly disappointing performance and called it a "gut punch" after winning significantly fewer votes than either Buttigieg or Sanders. Following the caucuses, Buttigieg became the first openly LGBT candidate to win any pledged national convention delegates towards a major party's presidential nomination.

=== Results by County ===
2020 Iowa Democratic Presidential Caucus (By County)
County	Bernie Sanders		Pete Buttigieg		Elizabeth Warren		Joe Biden		Amy Klobuchar		Andrew Yang		All Other Candidates (Note: Consists of the vote totals for Tom Steyer, Mike Bloomberg, Tulsi Gabbard, Michael Bennet, Deval L. Patrick, John K. Delaney, "Others," and "Uncommitted.")		Total
County	#	%	#	%	#	%	#	%	#	%	#	%	#	%	Total
Adair	53	23.45%	41	18.14%	18	7.96%	22	9.73%	56	24.78%	29	12.83%	7	3.10%	226
Adams	19	17.76%	18	16.82%	15	14.02%	31	28.97%	24	22.43%	0	0.00%	0	0.00%	107
Allamakee	83	16.73%	173	34.88%	46	9.27%	59	11.90%	97	19.56%	23	4.64%	15	3.02%	496
Appanoose	59	16.43%	143	39.83%	7	1.95%	102	28.41%	24	6.69%	4	1.11%	20	5.57%	359
Audubon	35	17.24%	31	15.27%	21	10.34%	61	30.05%	55	27.09%	0	0.00%	0	0.00%	203
Benton	179	22.29%	228	28.39%	65	8.09%	245	30.51%	82	10.21%	0	0.00%	4	0.49%	803
Black Hawk	2,168	31.27%	1,636	23.59%	1,255	18.10%	1,005	14.49%	768	11.08%	43	0.62%	59	0.85%	6,934
Boone	339	25.09%	436	32.27%	257	19.02%	107	7.92%	172	12.73%	14	1.04%	26	1.92%	1,351
Bremer	170	13.19%	412	31.96%	288	22.34%	195	15.13%	195	15.13%	1	0.08%	28	2.28%	1,289
Buchanan	88	11.80%	188	25.20%	49	6.57%	226	30.29%	121	16.22%	30	4.02%	44	5.90%	746
Buena Vista	128	24.38%	98	18.67%	84	16.00%	113	21.52%	59	11.24%	34	6.48%	9	1.71%	525
Butler	109	25.47%	83	19.39%	68	15.89%	86	20.09%	67	15.65%	10	2.43%	5	1.17%	428
Calhoun	37	14.57%	101	39.76%	34	13.39%	51	20.08%	28	11.02%	0	0.00%	3	1.18%	254
Carroll	79	12.85%	198	32.20%	51	8.29%	158	25.69%	120	19.51%	7	1.14%	2	0.32%	615
Cass	62	16.62%	99	26.54%	75	20.11%	83	22.25%	52	13.94%	0	0.00%	2	0.54%	373
Cedar	211	25.64%	205	24.91%	155	18.83%	96	11.66%	156	18.96%	0	0.00%	0	0.00%	823
Cerro Gordo	389	21.54%	530	29.35%	111	6.15%	323	17.88%	425	23.53%	16	0.89%	12	0.67%	1,806
Cherokee	68	26.15%	56	21.54%	12	4.62%	78	30.00%	30	11.54%	11	4.23%	5	1.92%	260
Chickasaw	25	6.46%	126	32.56%	67	17.31%	89	23.00%	57	14.73%	0	0.00%	23	5.94%	387
Clarke	58	22.83%	63	24.80%	16	6.30%	31	12.20%	60	23.62%	26	10.24%	0	0.00%	254
Clay	101	20.00%	118	23.37%	52	10.30%	133	26.34%	94	18.61%	6	1.19%	1	0.20%	505
Clayton	117	18.54%	232	36.77%	18	2.85%	104	16.48%	141	22.35%	0	0.00%	19	3.01%	631
Clinton	421	24.91%	468	27.69%	170	10.06%	406	24.02%	177	10.47%	18	1.07%	30	1.78%	1,690
Crawford	83	25.30%	53	16.16%	17	5.18%	120	36.59%	34	10.37%	21	6.40%	0	0.00%	328
Dallas	840	14.66%	1,926	33.62%	1,159	20.23%	1,085	18.94%	655	11.44%	48	0.84%	15	0.26%	5,728
Davis	22	11.40%	58	30.05%	29	15.03%	56	29.02%	26	13.47%	1	0.52%	1	0.52%	193
Decatur	76	23.90%	81	25.47%	75	23.58%	18	5.66%	65	20.44%	0	0.00%	3	0.94%	318
Delaware	19	4.48%	110	25.94%	90	21.23%	90	21.23%	100	23.58%	0	0.00%	14	3.54%	423
Des Moines	398	22.15%	631	35.11%	284	15.80%	294	16.36%	136	7.57%	40	2.23%	14	0.78%	1,797
Dickinson	118	17.85%	199	30.11%	57	8.62%	158	23.90%	118	17.85%	7	1.06%	4	0.61%	661
Dubuque	1,128	22.12%	1,451	28.45%	807	15.82%	1,187	23.27%	466	9.14%	27	0.53%	34	0.67%	5,100
Emmet	60	23.72%	68	26.88%	28	11.07%	33	13.04%	39	15.42%	0	0.00%	25	9.88%	253
Fayette	103	13.57%	286	37.68%	89	11.73%	172	22.66%	82	10.80%	7	0.92%	20	2.63%	759
Floyd	81	13.73%	139	23.56%	100	16.95%	123	20.85%	141	23.90%	0	0.00%	6	1.02%	590
Franklin	72	29.27%	65	26.42%	19	7.72%	45	18.29%	39	15.85%	3	1.22%	3	1.22%	246
Fremont	44	24.18%	51	28.02%	4	2.20%	44	24.18%	39	21.43%	0	0.00%	0	0.00%	182
Greene	94	26.26%	112	31.28%	16	4.47%	53	14.80%	76	21.23%	2	0.56%	5	1.40%	358
Grundy	90	24.93%	99	27.42%	23	6.37%	74	20.50%	65	18.01%	6	1.66%	4	1.11%	361
Guthrie	30	8.60%	82	23.50%	71	20.34%	40	11.46%	96	27.51%	29	8.31%	1	0.29%	349
Hamilton	95	17.56%	162	29.94%	101	18.67%	107	19.78%	74	13.68%	0	0.00%	2	0.37%	541
Hancock	46	17.49%	85	32.32%	20	7.60%	41	15.59%	70	26.62%	0	0.00%	1	0.38%	263
Hardin	89	15.98%	164	29.44%	104	18.67%	96	17.24%	102	18.31%	0	0.00%	2	0.36%	557
Harrison	106	26.24%	108	26.73%	53	13.12%	76	18.81%	60	14.85%	0	0.00%	1	0.25%	404
Henry	151	22.57%	186	27.80%	86	12.86%	117	17.49%	51	7.62%	78	11.66%	0	0.00%	669
Howard	49	18.85%	86	33.08%	21	8.08%	37	14.23%	39	15.00%	24	9.23%	4	1.54%	260
Humboldt	24	10.13%	66	27.85%	21	8.86%	73	30.80%	52	21.94%	1	0.42%	0	0.00%	237
Ida	12	8.28%	58	40.00%	1	0.69%	48	33.10%	25	17.24%	0	0.00%	1	0.69%	145
Iowa	173	25.26%	171	24.96%	170	24.82%	131	19.12%	38	5.55%	0	0.00%	2	0.30%	685
Jackson	85	11.07%	256	33.33%	111	14.45%	194	25.26%	90	11.72%	14	1.82%	18	2.34%	768
Jasper	342	21.98%	517	33.23%	228	14.65%	288	18.51%	113	7.26%	45	2.89%	23	1.48%	1,556
Jefferson	835	50.64%	179	10.86%	463	28.08%	79	4.79%	86	5.22%	0	0.00%	7	0.42%	1,649
Johnson	6,521	32.68%	3,760	18.84%	6,721	33.68%	607	3.04%	2,114	10.59%	22	0.11%	210	1.06%	19,955
Jones	133	21.84%	173	28.41%	66	10.84%	133	21.84%	100	16.42%	0	0.00%	4	0.66%	609
Keokuk	52	20.23%	84	32.68%	35	13.62%	31	12.06%	39	15.18%	7	2.72%	9	3.51%	257
Kossuth	37	8.20%	158	35.03%	27	5.99%	127	28.16%	94	20.84%	0	0.00%	8	1.77%	451
Lee	253	20.84%	413	34.02%	140	11.53%	286	23.56%	65	5.35%	40	3.29%	17	1.40%	1,214
Linn	4,031	27.18%	3,508	23.65%	3,182	21.46%	2,247	15.15%	1,678	11.31%	29	0.20%	155	1.06%	14,830
Louisa	71	23.20%	49	16.01%	59	19.28%	60	19.61%	22	7.19%	42	13.73%	3	0.98%	306
Lucas	56	25.00%	34	15.18%	27	12.05%	66	29.46%	28	12.50%	6	2.68%	7	3.13%	224
Lyon	35	18.92%	32	17.30%	35	18.92%	25	13.51%	56	30.27%	0	0.00%	2	1.08%	185
Madison	102	13.78%	235	31.76%	139	18.78%	137	18.51%	109	14.73%	0	0.00%	18	2.43%	740
Mahaska	164	26.89%	153	25.08%	99	16.23%	74	12.13%	58	9.51%	57	9.34%	5	0.82%	610
Marion	256	19.47%	502	38.17%	154	11.71%	173	13.16%	184	13.99%	46	3.50%	0	0.00%	1,315
Marshall	489	34.10%	426	29.71%	147	10.25%	266	18.55%	59	4.11%	1	0.07%	46	3.21%	1,434
Mills	107	25.78%	139	33.49%	50	12.05%	79	19.04%	40	9.64%	0	0.00%	0	0.00%	415
Mitchell	35	10.26%	73	21.41%	39	11.44%	66	19.35%	116	34.02%	12	3.52%	0	0.00%	341
Monona	32	14.81%	55	25.46%	47	21.76%	42	19.44%	27	12.50%	0	0.00%	13	6.02%	216
Monroe	30	18.52%	49	30.25%	18	11.11%	35	21.60%	25	15.43%	0	0.00%	5	3.09%	162
Montgomery	50	19.53%	91	35.55%	27	10.55%	45	17.58%	36	14.06%	0	0.00%	7	2.73%	256
Muscatine	550	32.56%	459	27.18%	259	15.23%	274	16.22%	120	7.10%	16	0.95%	11	0.65%	1,689
O'Brien	39	15.79%	50	20.24%	31	12.55%	51	20.65%	54	21.86%	3	1.21%	19	7.68%	247
Osceola	8	11.43%	23	32.86%	14	20.00%	11	15.71%	14	20.00%	0	0.00%	0	0.00%	70
Page	108	26.73%	120	29.70%	34	8.42%	57	14.11%	78	19.31%	7	1.73%	0	0.00%	404
Palo Alto	43	16.60%	73	28.19%	23	8.88%	83	32.05%	34	13.13%	0	0.00%	3	1.16%	259
Plymouth	138	23.23%	168	28.28%	37	12.63%	150	25.25%	75	6.23%	13	2.19%	13	2.19%	594
Pocahontas	23	12.78%	56	31.11%	14	7.78%	38	21.11%	40	22.22%	7	3.89%	2	1.11%	180
Polk	9,899	26.49%	10,034	26.85%	8,305	22.22%	4,810	12.87%	3,999	10.70%	25	0.07%	199	0.80%	37,271
Pottawattamie	770	25.68%	763	25.45%	528	17.61%	393	13.11%	374	12.47%	123	4.10%	47	1.56%	2,998
Poweshiek	686	39.09%	142	8.09%	590	33.62%	27	1.54%	170	9.69%	0	0.00%	130	7.98%	1,745
Ringgold	11	7.59%	32	22.07%	22	15.17%	46	31.72%	30	20.69%	0	0.00%	4	2.76%	145
Sac	53	23.77%	69	30.94%	28	12.56%	29	13.00%	40	17.94%	3	1.35%	1	0.45%	223
Scott	2,205	25.52%	2,353	27.24%	1,513	17.51%	1,240	14.35%	1,175	13.60%	112	1.30%	41	0.48%	8,639
Shelby	42	15.79%	84	31.58%	40	15.04%	41	15.41%	55	20.68%	1	0.38%	3	1.13%	266
Sioux	110	16.54%	110	16.54%	174	26.17%	60	9.02%	152	22.86%	56	8.42%	3	0.45%	665
Story	3,193	33.48%	1,485	15.57%	2,409	25.26%	383	4.02%	1,611	16.89%	252	2.64%	203	2.13%	9,536
Tama	171	30.16%	155	27.34%	62	10.93%	121	21.34%	29	5.11%	14	2.47%	15	2.65%	567
Taylor	14	14.58%	30	31.25%	11	11.46%	22	22.92%	12	12.50%	6	6.25%	1	1.04%	96
Union	103	30.38%	92	27.14%	48	14.16%	44	12.98%	41	12.09%	7	2.06%	4	1.18%	339
Van Buren	36	25.00%	56	38.89%	22	15.28%	27	18.75%	0	0.00%	0	0.00%	3	2.08%	144
Wapello	308	28.65%	335	31.16%	169	15.72%	244	22.70%	0	0.00%	14	1.30%	5	0.46%	1,075
Warren	459	15.65%	1,049	35.77%	576	19.64%	392	13.37%	411	14.01%	3	0.10%	43	1.46%	2,933
Washington	266	27.62%	175	18.17%	216	22.43%	123	12.77%	178	18.48%	0	0.00%	5	0.51%	963
Wayne	25	18.52%	26	19.26%	26	19.26%	16	11.85%	41	30.37%	0	0.00%	1	0.74%	135
Webster	234	19.52%	482	40.20%	98	8.17%	277	23.10%	86	7.17%	4	0.33%	18	1.50%	1,199
Winnebago	50	12.76%	121	30.87%	82	20.92%	38	9.69%	66	16.84%	29	7.40%	6	1.53%	392
Winneshiek	407	22.04%	545	29.51%	352	19.06%	34	1.84%	457	24.74%	49	2.65%	3	0.16%	1,847
Woodbury	1,031	32.15%	663	20.67%	462	14.41%	747	23.29%	211	6.58%	40	1.25%	53	1.64%	3,207
Worth	46	16.67%	55	19.93%	35	12.68%	39	14.13%	77	27.90%	23	8.33%	1	0.36%	276
Wright	74	21.89%	116	34.32%	14	4.14%	55	16.27%	74	21.89%	0	0.00%	5	1.48%	338
Totals	45,831	26.55%	43,273	25.06%	34,932	20.23%	23,631	13.69%	21,120	12.23%	1,759	1.02%	2,109	1.22%	172,655

== Delay in final results ==
Up until February 4 at 4:00 pm local time, the Iowa Democratic Party (IDP) had not reported any final results due to what a party spokesperson described as "quality checks". According to The New York Times, a new app-based reporting system may have been responsible for the delay, with Sean Bagniewski, the Polk County Democratic Party chairman, reporting that only "20% of his 177 precinct chairs" could access the app. In a statement released on February 3 at 10:30 pm local time, IDP communications director Mandy McClure said "inconsistencies" had been found in the three sets of results. However, McClure also assured that the delay was not the result of a "hack or intrusion" and that the overall results are "sound". During the delay in the release of final results, the campaigns of Pete Buttigieg and Bernie Sanders both released incomplete results taken by their respective precinct captains, respectively showing the two candidates as having won the caucus. Also during the delay, Amy Klobuchar's campaign manager, Justin Buoen, claimed that Klobuchar either exceeded or equaled the number of votes that Joe Biden received.

Problems encountered included usage and interface failures of an app designed to report final vote tallies for Iowa precinct captains; a backlog of phone calls to the state vote-reporting hotline, including at least one case of a precinct captain being placed on an hour-long hold, only to have the hotline attendant immediately hang up on him when finally answering; confusion about coin flips to decide delegates; the need to use backup paper ballots to verify the results; and discrepancies between backup paper ballots and tallies by precinct captains. Reporters found that the Internet message board 4chan had encouraged its members to flood the phone lines of the DNC in Des Moines, which further complicated the process of reporting results. Additionally, the reported data had to be entered manually, which took longer than expected.

The morning after the caucus, Iowa Democratic Party Chair Troy Price issued a clarifying statement, reiterating that he did not believe there was a "cyber security intrusion", and that "data collected via the app was sound". Rather, due to a "coding issue in the reporting system", the app was reporting out only "partial data" from what had been recorded. This flaw was verified by comparison to the paper vote records and examination of the underlying data recorded by the app. The Iowa Democratic Party said in a statement that it planned to release partial results at 4:00 pm local time on Tuesday, nearly a full day after caucuses began.

Moreover, several precinct captains reportedly released their results to the Iowa Democratic Party over 24 hours before numbers were reported, with some criticizing the length of time taken for the party to release results as well as the process's lack of transparency.

=== IowaRecorder app ===
The app, named IowaRecorder, was developed by Shadow Inc., a majority-owned subsidiary of Acronym. The company received money from the Biden, Buttigieg, and Kirsten Gillibrand campaigns for services distinct from the app; Biden's campaign paid the firm $1,225 for text messaging, Buttigieg's campaign paid $42,500 for software service, and Gillibrand's campaign paid $37,400 for software, text, and fundraising services.

Social media posts claimed shortly after the election that the Buttigieg campaign had influence over the creation of the app, a theory which was supported by the Associated Press. The app makers were criticized for having conflicts of interest due to the company behind the app selling separate services to campaigns associated with Biden, Buttigieg, and Gillibrand; as well as a PAC founded by Tom Steyer and connections to former staffers for Hillary Clinton, among others.

App-development expert Kasra Rahjerdi said "the app was clearly done by someone following a tutorial. It's similar to projects I do with my mentees who are learning how to code." A team of researchers at Stanford University, including former Facebook chief security officer Alex Stamos, said that while analyzing the app they found potentially concerning code within it, including hard-coded API keys. The faulty app coding was found to have caused some incorrect and incomplete result calculation, creating a discrepancy between its data input and data output, which made the app useless for the report of results from all the precinct caucuses (meaning that all data reporting instead had to be phoned/mailed and manually typed into a calculating work sheet).

The app was also criticized for its lack of user-friendliness and openness to potential hacks and data intercepts, though factors such as age of operators may have impacted usability. The youngest-staffed precinct in the state, Sheldon Ward 2, was headed by 20-year-old Caleb Schreurs who was quoted in The N'west Iowa Review saying: “I had zero problem, [the IDP] were very, very secure with it."

== Inconsistencies in votes ==
During the initial release of the results, it was noted that some of the data being reported were inconsistent, flawed, or entirely impossible. According to The New York Times, more than 100 precincts reported incorrect results. Most common errors included wrong number of delegates being allotted to candidates and disparities in numbers released by the Iowa Democratic Party (IDP) and those reported by precincts. One such example is in Black Hawk County, where the county supervisor independently released results of his county via Facebook that varied from the later-released results provided by the Iowa Democratic Party—which incorrectly gave Elizabeth Warren delegates to Tom Steyer and Bernie Sanders delegates to Deval Patrick, despite the latter reportedly receiving zero votes in the county. Although corrections were later made, these results still varied from those given by the county supervisor.

This quickly gave rise to a number of conspiracy theories online that were accusing the Democratic Party of corruption and cheating in favor of Buttigieg and other candidates at the expense of Sanders. On February 6, three days after the caucus, and with three percent of the results still unreported, the Democratic Party chairman Tom Perez requested a recanvass of the results, saying:

Enough is enough. In light of the problems that have emerged in the implementation of the delegate selection plan and in order to assure public confidence in the results, I am calling on the Iowa Democratic Party to immediately begin a recanvass.

Because Perez specified satellite caucuses in his request for a recanvass, an area where Sanders support was strong, Sanders supporters on social media accused the Democratic National Committee of rigging the caucus against him.

According to the IDP, errors on the handwritten caucus math worksheets could not be corrected because they are unalterable legal records."The incorrect math on the Caucus Math Worksheets must not be changed to ensure the integrity of the process" wrote the party lawyer, Shayla McCormally, according to an email sent by IDP chair Troy Price. Photographs of caucus math worksheets taken by caucus "captains" showed errors in adding up votes for candidates and in calculating "state delegate equivalents". IDP chair Troy Price said that a recount of votes would be required to correct the miscalculations on the handwritten tally sheets from precincts.

== Analysis ==
According to entrance polls by CNN, the close result was due to splits among key demographic groups: gender, educational attainment and age. Buttigieg won women with 24%, while Sanders won men with 26%. Buttigieg won voters with a college degree with 23%, while Sanders won among voters with a high school education or less with 30%. Sanders continued the trend of 2016 in which he won young voters, winning 44% in the 18–29 demographic and 41% with voters under 45 overall, while Buttigieg won older voters (40–64).

Contrary to media belief in Biden's strength among non-white voters, Sanders won that demographic in Iowa with 46% support, with Buttigieg placing second with 15% and Biden placing third with only 13% support. According to CNN reported entrance polls, Buttigieg won white voters with 23%. However, The New York Times indicates a statistical tie at 23%, with a slight advantage to Sanders. Some counties carried by Buttigieg, such as Clinton County, had swung from Obama in 2012 to Trump in 2016 by double digits.

Although Latinos constitute a relatively small portion of Iowa's electorate, Sanders performed exceptionally well with Latino voters, winning all 32 Latino-majority and plurality precincts in the state with 52.6% of the vote, well ahead of Buttigieg (14%) and Biden (13.5%). He also won all four Spanish-language satellite caucus sites by overwhelming margins. Matt A. Barreto noted that Sanders's strength among the Latino demographic alone provided him with an 18.6 SDE advantage over Buttigieg, making up lost ground in other demographics where Buttigieg performed better. Sanders's success with Latino voters could be credited to the "Latino strategy" his campaign is pursuing by focusing on Latino voter outreach.

Buttigieg declared victory before any official results were released. Bernie Sanders' campaign also declared victory as he earned the most votes. Buttigieg's declaration of victory in Iowa provided him with a boost in polls going into New Hampshire, a state where Sanders had been polling consistently well.

In addition to technical glitches, the meltdown of the caucuses were also fueled by argument over whether Iowa should be first to vote, as many point out the state's overwhelming white population, which doesn't reflect the Democratic Party and the country as a whole. In April 2022, a DNC panel voted to strip Iowa of its "first-in-the-nation" status.

== See also ==
- 2020 Iowa Republican presidential caucuses
