= Courier Newsroom =

American digital media group

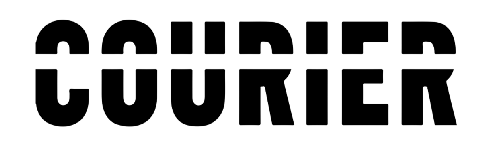
- Founded: 2019
- Founder: Tara McGowan
- Headquarters: Washington, D.C.
- Owner: Good Information Inc.
- Website: couriernewsroom.com

Courier Newsroom is an American digital media company that operates news outlets and sponsors political content intended to support Democratic Party candidates. (Note: Courier Newsroom, which Bloomberg called "a liberal, digital spin on local news.") It microtargets voters via social media advertising with the intention to both inform and persuade.

Courier's lack of transparency about its funding sources and glowing coverage of Democratic candidates have raised questions about its reliability and about the line between advocacy and journalism. Courier engages in political microtargeting and the Columbia Journalism Review described Courier's business model as "money from interested parties who seek a particular political outcome."

Courier was founded in 2019 by Tara McGowan, a political strategist and former journalist who previously worked for Barack Obama's campaign and the SuperPAC Priorities USA Action. Courier was launched by ACRONYM and is now owned by Good Information Inc.

== History ==
Courier Newsroom was founded in 2019 by Tara McGowan. As of May 2020, Courier Newsroom websites had a budget of $11 million, a staff of 60 reporters and 12 editors, and aimed to publish approximately 300 articles and videos a week. Courier Newsroom raised $15 million in the first half of 2022 from donors including Reid Hoffman and George Soros. The outlet spent over $5 million on Facebook and Instagram advertising designed to promote Democratic candidates and members of Congress. Mark Zuckerberg's concern that the Courier Newsroom was not a real news outlet sparked a 2020 change in policy at Facebook, which started to limit the reach of partisan sites by restricting their access and curtailing their advertising. Courier Newsroom was originally owned by liberal dark money group ACRONYM, but ACRONYM later divested its stake in the company in April 2021.

As of June 2021, Courier Newsroom operates progressive digital news outlets in ten states. In June 2021, the company acquired a progressive political news site, Iowa Starting Line, which the New York Times called "the best political journalism you've never heard of."

In July 2025, Semafor reported that Courier's CEO told their donors that they were coming off the worst fundraising quarter in six years and as a result, hadn't been able to effectively use their websites to build opposition to the Trump administration: "Without funding, we can't get these stories in front of more of the audiences we need to be reaching to increase awareness and opposition. We currently do not have any funding to boost our coverage of this bill to news-avoidant Americans who are not already subscribing to our newsrooms, and no new funding to increase our subscriber bases in critical competitive districts and states."

== Strategy ==
The Courier Newsroom's local digital news outlets are not traditional town newspapers. Instead, they are websites designed to encourage people in key swing states to vote Democratic, while looking like local newspapers. (Note: the effort is also designed to help elect Democrats, by delivering partisan news stories to swing-state voters on Facebook) The articles are promoted on social media such as Facebook, which does not prohibit the practice because the newspapers are for-profit.

Funders include George Soros, Reid Hoffman, and movie producers. Courier Newsroom received $250,000 from Planned Parenthood between June 2021 and June 2022. It received $715,000 in 2022 from "a dark money group with close ties to the Democratic Attorneys General Association" for "content creation and promotion." According to NOTUS, that same year "Courier wrote frequently and favorably of a Democratic attorney general candidate in Nevada named Aaron Ford." Ford won his election.

In 2020, the Hopewell Fund backed Courier Newsroom. The New York Times reported that Courier "published articles favoring Democrats and received millions of dollars from dark money groups. It was paid $2.6 million by a nonprofit linked to House Democratic leadership to promote articles."

As of 2024, Courier Newsroom had spent more than $12 million on Facebook and Instagram ads. This number does not include spending on TikTok, which does not disclose advertising spending.

In October 2024, Courier Newsroom spent over $6 million on political ads on Facebook, making them the third highest spender on political ads on Meta, trailing only the Harris and Trump campaigns themselves. According to the Columbia Journalism Review, "Courier's pattern of spending in the 2024 election cycle also raises inevitable questions about funding sources and demonstrates to what extent the network is a campaigning tool rather than local journalism." Courier's ads recruited participants "to a program that claims they can receive up to $400 for talking to their family and friends about 'voting for Kamala Harris and Democrats this election cycle.'"

In February 2025, Tara McGowan addressed a summit of Democratic donors and operatives that had gathered to "discuss how the left's well-funded digital media ecosystem failed in the 2024 election." The meeting included representatives of the Emerson Collective, Catalist, Soros Fund Management, NowThis, and Crooked Media. The production of more effective short and long form video was discussed as was "how to better collaborate with influencers to push progressive messages out."

== Reception ==
Courier Newsroom was originally owned by ACRONYM; the creation and operation of Courier Newsroom initially raised ethics questions about ACRONYM and about its financiers, who include billionaires Reid Hoffman and Laurene Powell Jobs. A complaint to the Federal Elections Commission was dismissed and ACRONYM has since dissolved.

Carrie Brown, director of social journalism at the journalism school at City University of New York, found the targeting of news to swing voters "problematic." (Note: Carrie Brown, director of social journalism at the Craig Newmark Graduate School of Journalism at the City University of New York. But the notion of targeting it directly at specific voters in swing states, "that is interesting and more problematic.") Vox reported that "the Courier Newsroom launch did raise some eyebrows. If this were a Republican operative declaring its strategy like this, a lot of Democrats probably would have criticized it." According to OpenSecrets, "websites affiliated with Courier Newsroom that appear to be free-standing local news outlets are actually part of a coordinated effort with deep ties to Democratic political operatives."

NewsGuard, which rates news sources, warns readers that Courier Newsroom websites are "insufficiently transparent" and "cherry-pick facts to advance a Democratic narrative." Gabby Deutch, writing on behalf of NewsGuard, called Courier News a "faux news site" and said while "[u]nlike some sources of partisan disinformation, Courier stories are generally fact-based" its strategy is nevertheless "pumping up moderate Democrats elected to Congress in 2018 in Republican-leaning districts." In 2020, NewsGuard rated the Courier websites as "generally unreliable." (Note: assessed the Courier websites as "generally unreliable.") In 2024, NewGuard's editor said that "Courier Newsroom sites do not disclose ownership and financing, they do not disclose possible conflicts of interest, nor do they gather and present information responsibility." NewsGuard has warned that "Courier's undisclosed funders and glowing coverage of Democratic candidates should raise questions about its reliability." A 2024 study by NewsGuard found that "the number of partisan-backed outlets designed to look like impartial news outlets has officially surpassed the number of real, local daily newspapers in the U.S." NewsGuard identified at least 1,265 such websites "backed by dark money or intentionally masquerading as local news sites for political purposes." According to Axios, almost half of these websites are targeted to swing states, "a clear sign that they're designed to influence politics." Courier Newsroom was described by Axios as having "some of the more strategic sites."

NOTUS wrote that "Courier grew out of a series of explicitly political experiments that hinged on using paid online advertising to turn out voters. It then pivoted to being a privately owned media company" that is "testing the limits of what a newsroom can be."

According to The Wall Street Journal, outlets like Courier try to capitalize on readers' trust in local news sources "while playing down their partisan interests and often obscuring their donors."

The Columbia Journalism Review (CJR) described Courier's business model as "money from interested parties who seek a particular political outcome." CJR also reported that Courier engages in political microtargeting wherein "employees at Courier's headquarters are responsible for testing whether content produced by its local newsrooms is successful in moving voters in a desired progressive direction."

Courier Newsroom has been accused of producing pink-slime journalism.

== Websites ==
Courier Newsroom lists 11 affiliated websites:

- Iowa Starting Line, Iowa, acquired June 2021. Founder Pat Rynard
- Copper Courier, Arizona, launched October 2019.
- The Dogwood, launched mid-2019. At launch, The Dogwood was owned by an ACRONYM subsidiary, For What Is Worth Media, Inc.
- Up North News, Wisconsin. Founding Editor: Pat Kreitlow.
- The 'Gander, Michigan
- Cardinal & Pine, North Carolina. (Note: A Facebook ad about Trump and the pandemic from "Cardinal & Pine," a North Carolina-focused Courier outlet, was seen disproportionately by people who were young and female, a group that turns out at a relatively low rate, but tends to support Democrats)
- The Keystone
- The Nevadan
- Floricua, Florida
- Granite Post, New Hampshire
- Courier Texas

== See also ==
- Left-wing alternative media in the United States
