= Project for Good Information =

American media firm

The Project for Good Information (PGI) is an American group founded by Democratic strategist Tara McGowan.

Launched in February 2021, its stated purpose is to combat disinformation and misinformation online by promoting verified traditional media outlets, and it has called for the regulation of social media platforms to combat misinformation.

The project includes forming a 501(c)(3) organization called the Good Information Project, which will grant money to non-profit media companies, and a public benefit corporation called Good Information Inc., which will invest in for-profit media companies. Good Information Inc. has high-profile billionaire backers, such as Reid Hoffman and George Soros, and is the owner of Courier Newsroom.

== See also ==
- Acronym (organization)
- Campaign finance reform in the United States
- Counterpropaganda
- Fake news
- Fake news website
