= Tara McGowan =

American political strategist and journalist

- Born: 1985 or 1986 (age 40–41)
- Education: New York University (BA)
- Occupation: Political strategist

Tara McGowan (born 1985 or 1986) is an American Democratic political strategist and former journalist. She was the co-founder and CEO of multiple organizations which have been noted for large expenditures on digital advertising in preparation for the 2020 United States presidential election, including the political organization Acronym, the company Lockwood Strategy, and the media company Courier Newsroom.

She was the director of the advertising branch of Priorities USA Action, which was the primary super PAC supporting Hillary Clinton's 2016 presidential campaign, and was a digital producer for the re-election campaign of Barack Obama. Previously, she was the press secretary for United States Senator Jack Reed. In 2021, she stepped down from Acronym to launch a new media company, Good Information Inc.

== Early life and education ==
McGowan graduated from Rogers High School in Newport, Rhode Island, in 2004. She graduated from New York University with degrees in journalism and political science.

== Journalism and early career ==
McGowan began her career as a journalist, working on the CBS program 60 Minutes. After covering the Barack Obama 2008 presidential campaign, she left journalism to become the press secretary for Jack Reed, a United States Senator from Rhode Island. During the 2012 United States presidential election, McGowan was a digital producer for Barack Obama's re-election campaign.

== Digital advertising and media career ==
During the 2016 presidential election, McGowan directed the $42 million digital advertising branch of Priorities USA Action, the primary super PAC supporting Hillary Clinton's campaign. It was the largest ever ad campaign by the PAC.

In 2017, McGowan launched the political strategy firm Lockwood Strategy, which Campaigns and Elections identified as a crucial force in Democratic Party victories in the 2017 Virginia elections.

In the 2020 Democratic primary, McGowan supported Pete Buttigieg's campaign and opposed Bernie Sanders.

Shortly after founding Lockwood Strategy, McGowan co-founded the digital advertising organization Acronym together with Michael Dubin and with Laurene Powell Jobs and Reid Hoffman's financial backing. Within just over a year, Acronym had raised tens of millions of dollars for digital advertising campaigns, running more than 100 ad campaigns and registering 60,000 voters.

=== Courier Newsroom ===
One of McGowan's projects, called Courier Newsroom, is a for-profit media company that produces digital newspapers in Arizona, Michigan, North Carolina, Pennsylvania, Virginia, and Wisconsin, with the aim of filling news deserts in swing states by providing regional news coverage from a left-wing perspective. McGowan's goal of creating a partisan online newsroom is partly intended to combat online fake news, which led The New Yorker to label McGowan "a starry-eyed techno-utopian" for her stated belief that digital information is the most effective way to combat digital misinformation.

In July 2025, Semafor reported that McGowan told Courier Newsroom's donors that they were coming off the worst fundraising quarter in six years and as a result, hadn't been able to effectively use their websites to build opposition to the Trump administration: "Without funding, we can't get these stories in front of more of the audiences we need to be reaching to increase awareness and opposition. We currently do not have any funding to boost our coverage of this bill to news-avoidant Americans who are not already subscribing to our newsrooms, and no new funding to increase our subscriber bases in critical competitive districts and states."

== Reception ==
McGowan has been credited with significant innovations in digital political strategy, and has been described as one of the few progressive strategists to focus specifically on digital media. Joshua Green, writing for Bloomberg News, wrote that McGowan has "gained notoriety for her outspoken criticism of her party's inability to challenge, or even clearly comprehend, Trump's dominance of the digital landscape".

Ozy magazine called her "The Democrats' most dangerous digital strategist", with Nick Fouriezos writing that her efforts "will be one of the major forces shaping the Democrats' general-election fight against Donald Trump". In 2020, Politico referred to her as "one of the Democratic Party's most in-demand leaders this cycle". McGowan was named a 2018 Rising Star by Campaigns and Elections.

== Personal life ==
In 2015, McGowan married Michael Halle, a political consultant who has worked as a lead organizer in Iowa for Hillary Clinton and as a senior strategist for Pete Buttigieg. As of March 2025, McGowan was dating U.S. Senator Chris Murphy (D-CT). They broke up in October 2025.
