= Acronym (organization) =

American political organization

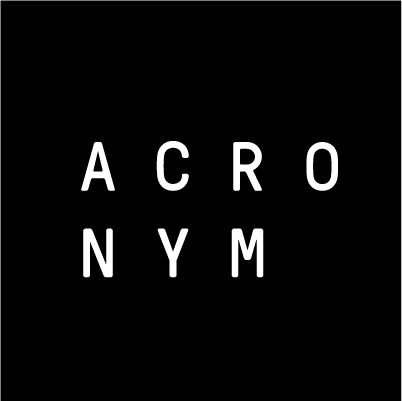
- Formation: March 1, 2017; 9 years ago
- Founders: Tara McGowan; Michael Dubin (Note: "ACRONYM, "a new, digital-first political organization" co-founded by Michael Dubin, the Dollar Shave Club CEO")
- Type: Nonprofit political advocacy group
- Tax ID no.: 82-1630469
- Legal status: 501(c)(4)
- Purpose: "We build power + modern infrastructure for a new progressive movement."
- Headquarters: Washington, D.C.
- President and CEO: Tara McGowan
- Director: Michael Dubin
- Treasurer: Hannah Linkenhoker
- Revenue: $1,294,938 (2017)
- Expenses: $1,297,124 (2017)
- Website: www.anotheracronym.org

Acronym (styled ACRONYM) is an American 501(c)(4) non-profit corporation, co-founded by Tara McGowan and Michael Dubin in 2017. The organization is one of the major coordinators and producers of digital media campaigns aligned with the Democratic Party, and has been hired by or has provided support to various other organizations including the Democratic Congressional Campaign Committee, Emily's List, Everytown for Gun Safety, and Planned Parenthood. It was the majority owner of Shadow, Inc., a technology company that made the mobile application software that malfunctioned during vote tallying at the 2020 Iowa Democratic caucuses, but later divested its stake in the company.

== Digital media ==
McGowan and Dubin co-founded Acronym in 2017 with the stated intention of "advancing progressive causes through innovative communications, advertising, and organizing programs". Since then, Acronym has made significant investments in digital media campaigns that aim to register voters. Within just over a year of its founding, Acronym had raised tens of millions of dollars for digital advertising campaigns, running more than 100 ad campaigns and registering 60,000 voters.

In 2019, Acronym launched the Courier Newsroom, a digital for-profit media company which publishes what appear to be local pseudo-news outlets but which are actually Democratic Party propaganda efforts. (Note: Courier Newsroom, which Bloomberg called "a liberal, digital spin on local news.") The creation and operation of Courier Newsroom has raised outrage and ethics questions about Acronym and its donors, who include billionaires Reid Hoffman and Laurene Powell Jobs.

In November 2020, Fast Company called Acronym "the Democrats' most advanced digital advertising project."

== Funding ==
Acronym's backers include Michael Dubin (founder of Dollar Shave Club), Reid Hoffman, and Laurene Powell Jobs.

Acronym's affiliated organizations and political action committee (PAC) donors include organizations linked to high-profile Americans like the director Steven Spielberg and LinkedIn founder Reid Hoffman. (Note: Acronym's affiliated PAC and web of other organizations are funded with millions from high-profile Democrats including director Steven Spielberg and LinkedIn co-founder Reid Hoffman) Other donors of $100,000 or more include Kate Capshaw, Jeffrey Katzenberg, and Mimi Haas. Acronym's PAC, PACRONYM, has further received "eight-figure checks" from financiers Seth Klarman and Donald Sussman, from venture capitalist Michael Moritz, and from George Soros's Democracy PAC. Quartz summarized the top donors to PACRONYM as "hedge funds, Silicon Valley, and Hollywood."

Because of the substantial volume of money that it has raised, and because of its status as a 501(c)(4) political nonprofit organization that is not required to disclose the donations it receives, Acronym has been widely described as a dark money group. Acronym, like other dark money groups, has received criticism for the lack of transparency in its funding structure, although McGowan and others have defended the 501(c)(4) funding structure as a useful innovation for progressive advertising groups to adopt.

== Relationships, clients, activities, staff ==
Hosted by Tara McGowan, the FWIW Podcast was a biweekly podcast about the digital race for the White House in 2016. Past guests included David Plouffe, Jeff Zeleny, and DNC CTO Nell Thomas.

In 2019, the Iowa Democratic Party paid $63,000 to Shadow, Inc., a for-profit software company acquired by Acronym, to create a mobile application (app) to tally results from the 2020 Iowa Democratic caucuses. Shadow, Inc. was created in 2019 by Acronym when they acquired the technology firm Groundbase from Gerard Niemira, who was then made CEO of Shadow, Inc. Niemira had also previously served as chief operating officer and chief technology officer of Acronym prior to being CEO of Shadow, Inc.

In the wake of Acronym's involvement in the 2020 Iowa Caucuses' vote tallying problems, McGowan downplayed Acronym's connection to the app Shadow that was responsible for delays and inconsistencies in reporting election results. A report in The Intercept, however, found that "internal company documents, a source close to the firms, and public records show a close and intertwined relationship between Acronym and Shadow." ACRONYM later divested its interest in Shadow Inc.

In addition to Shadow, Inc., Acronym has owned several for-profit corporations, including the digital strategy firm Lockwood Strategy and the media company FWIW Media. Acronym planned to launch an apparel company called Rogue Swag, and later ran an apparel campaign under that name. Courier Newsroom, which describes itself as a "progressive media company", is also owned by Acronym. Courier Newsroom acts as a parent company for local news websites.

In November 2019, Acronym founder Tara McGowan announced that Acronym and its affiliated Super PAC, called Pacronym (and styled PACRONYM), would undertake a $75 million online advertising campaign targeting four potential swing states in the 2020 United States presidential election. Pacronym received $2,407,208 in 2018 and spent $1,000,000 (43%) the same year in payments to Lockwood Strategy, also owned by Acronym. Since the campaign of incumbent president Donald Trump was reported to have a significant advantage in digital advertising during the 2020 Democratic Party presidential primaries, this large expenditure by a Democratic-aligned organisation was considered by many political strategists and media commentators to be a crucial safeguard for the Democratic Party against the risk of being outspent in digital advertising before their presidential nominee could be chosen. Nick Fouriezos of Ozy magazine identified Acronym, and McGowan's efforts in particular, as "one of the major forces shaping the Democrats' general-election fight against Donald Trump".

The Democratic Congressional Campaign Committee, Emily's List, Everytown for Gun Safety, and Planned Parenthood have hired Acronym for digital organizing services.

David Plouffe, who was campaign manager for former president Barack Obama, serves on the board of directors of Acronym.
