= Samidoun =

Pro-Palestinian and anti-Israel advocacy group

- Samidoun: Palestinian Prisoner Solidarity Network
- صامدون

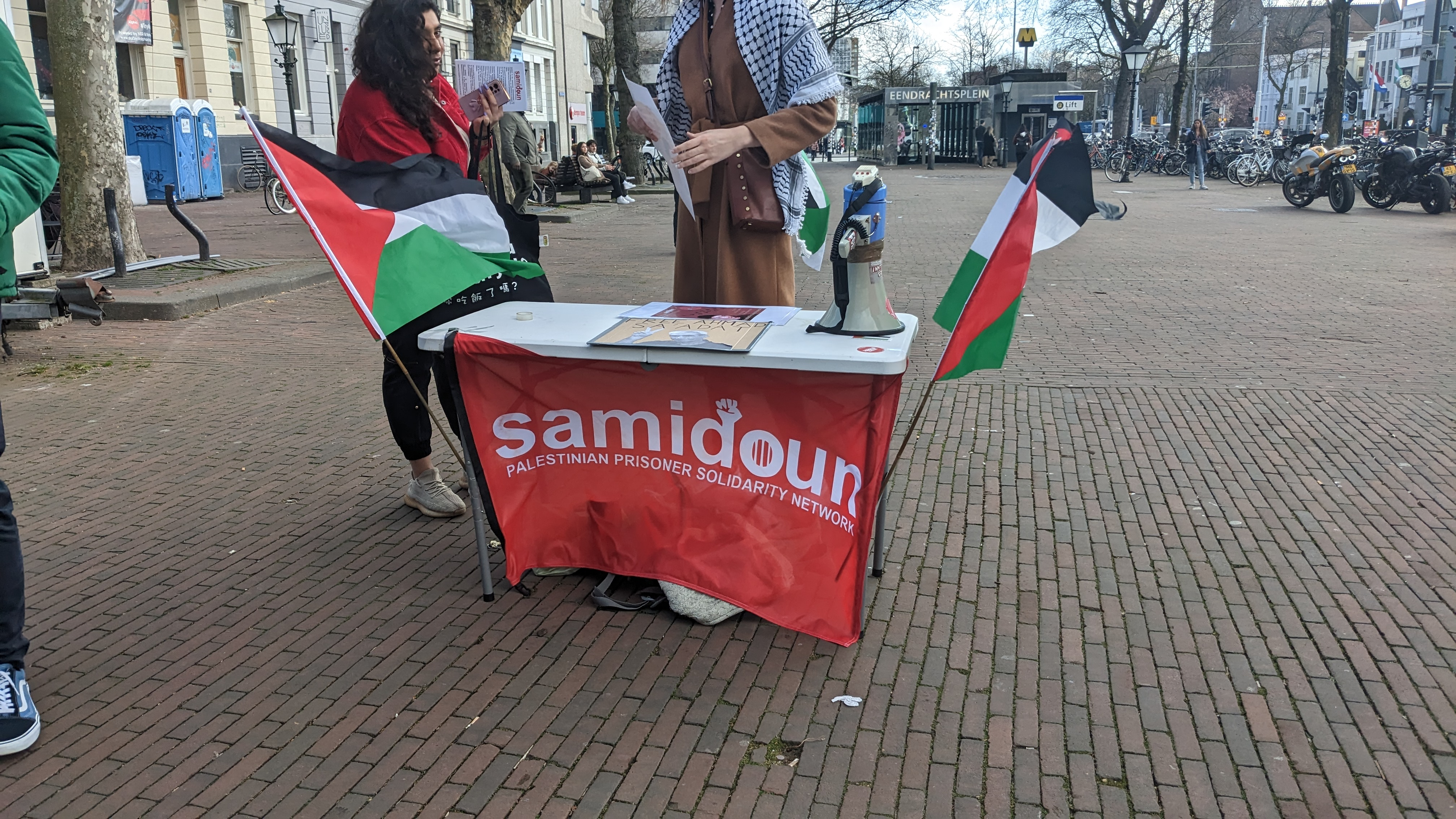
- Samidoun stand in Rotterdam (March 2023)
- Formation: 2011; 15 years ago
- Founder: Charlotte Kates and Khaled Barakat
- Type: Nonprofit (status revoked in March 2026)
- Headquarters: Vancouver, British Columbia
- Board of directors: Charlotte Kates; Dave Diewert; Thomas Gerhard Hofland
- Parent organization: Alliance for Global Justice
- Website: samidoun.net

Samidoun (Arabic: صامدون, romanized: Ṣāmidūn, lit. 'steadfast'—see sumud for the cultural context of this term), officially Samidoun: Palestinian Prisoner Solidarity Network, is a pro-Palestinian and anti-Israel advocacy group based in Canada. Samidoun was banned by Germany in November 2023 and was designated as a terrorist organization by Canada and sanctioned by the United States in October 2024. In March 2026, the Canadian government dissolved the group as a federally registered nonprofit.

Samidoun has been designated as a terrorist group by Israel and Canada for raising funds for the Popular Front for the Liberation of Palestine (PFLP), a political and militant group that the US, European Union, and several other countries designate as a terrorist organization. Samidoun has been described as "pro-Hamas". Samidoun founder Khaled Barakat was also designated as a terrorist in Canada, where he is a citizen, and as a "Specially Designated National" or SDN by the United States Department of the Treasury's Office of Foreign Assets Control (OFAC) in October 2024 for fundraising and operating on behalf of the PFLP.

Samidoun and its fiscal sponsor, the Arizona-based Alliance for Global Justice, have been de-platformed from a number of major financial platforms. Leaders of Samidoun have led "death to Canada, death to the United States and death to Israel" chants and have said that the chants accurately reflect the group's goal of destroying "colonial, capitalist states." Since the October 7 attacks and ensuing Gaza war, Samidoun has organized Palestinian solidarity protests in the US and Canada.

== History and activity ==
Based in Vancouver, British Columbia, Samidoun was founded in 2011 after a hunger strike in Israeli prisons organized by the Popular Front for the Liberation of Palestine (PFLP). Samidoun was incorporated as a federal not-for-profit agency in Canada in 2021.

Samidoun is led by Charlotte Kates, Dave Diewert, and Thomas Gerhard Hofland. Kates is a New Jersey native and Rutgers University graduate who is married to Samidoun founder, Khaled Barakat, who was born near Jerusalem. Barakat is considered to be a PFLP leader by the US government. He was deported from the United States in 2003.

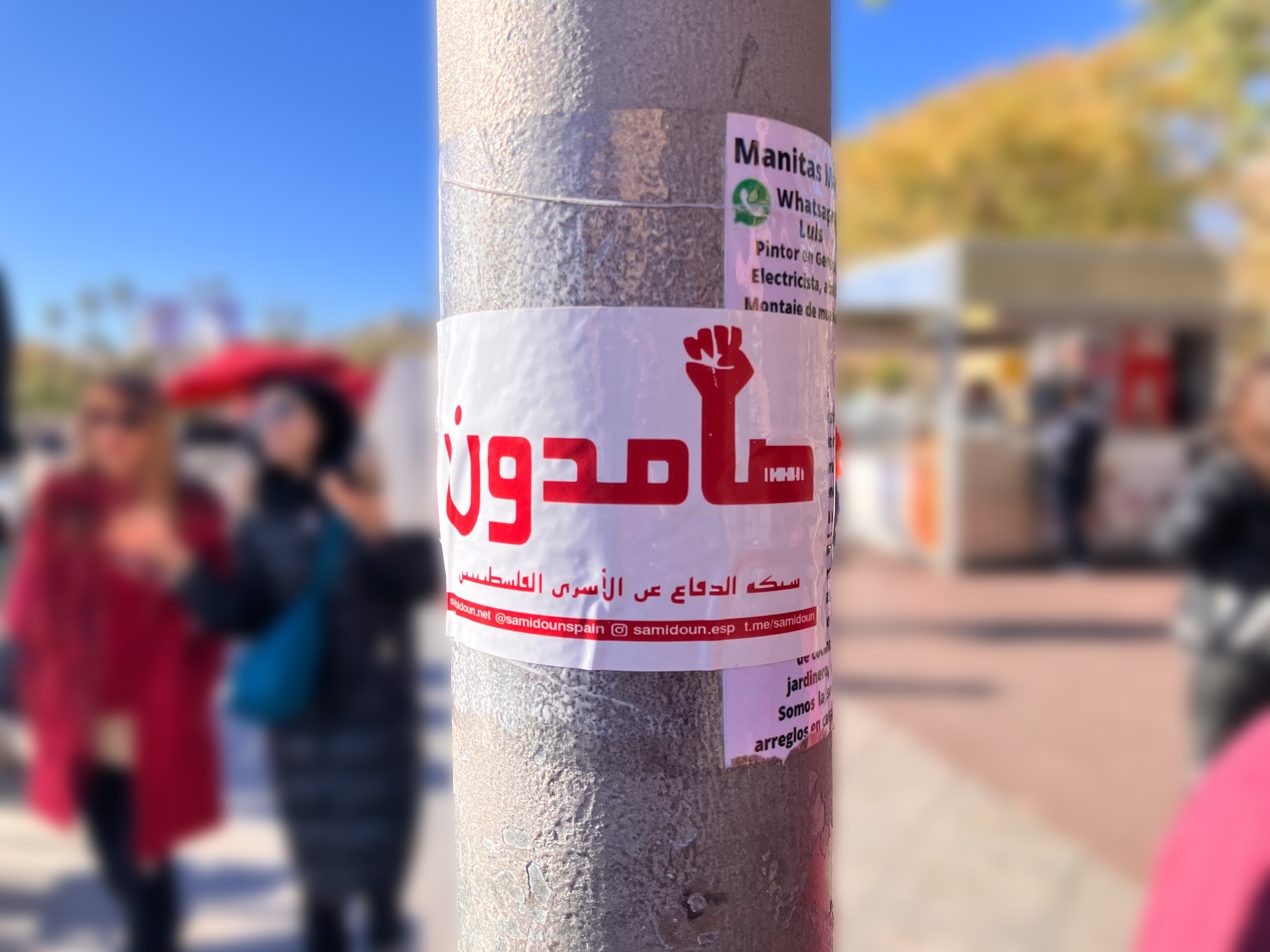
Arabic language Samidoun sticker on a pole in Barcelona, Catalonia, Spain

On the first anniversary of the October 7 attacks, a speaker at a rally in Vancouver organized by Samidoun identified themselves with Hezbollah and Hamas and called for death to the United States, Canada, and Israel. Participants at the same event were seen burning a Canadian flag. Samidoun confirmed and defended the actions, saying they accurately reflected its goal of "destroying the colonialist, capitalist state of Canada" and stand by the "death to Canada" phrase "as the call to action that it is". Kates was arrested in April 2024 after she led a chant of "Long live October 7" and referred to a number of designated terrorist organizations as heroes at a demonstration in Vancouver. Kates has said that Hamas and Hezbollah are "not engaging in terrorism" but are "engaging in a national liberation struggle." As of May 2025, the Canadian government had not decided whether to approve the hate crime charges against Kates. In August 2024, she travelled to Iran to accept an Islamic Human Rights and Human Dignity Award.

In February 2026, Greek authorities arrested and detained Mohammed Khatib, the European coordinator of Samidoun, at Heraklion Airport in Crete while he was travelling to attend a public event. Greek officials reportedly informed him that he was inadmissible on national security grounds and initiated deportation proceedings. Prior to the incident in Greece, Khatib had previously faced residency restrictions in Belgium.

== Funding ==
Samidoun's fiscal sponsor is the Arizona-based Alliance for Global Justice (AFGJ). As the fiscal sponsor for Samidoun, AFGJ and Samidoun are legally indistinguishable.

Since 2019, various financial platforms, including American Express, PayPal, Donorbox, Plaid, and Discover, have stopped processing funding for Samidoun and the AFGJ, "citing fears of relations to terror activity." In February 2023, the AFGJ announced that the company that handled its credit card transactions had blocked its ability to process donations due to allegations that Samidoun was involved in terrorist activities. Donors to AFGJ have included the Tides Foundation and the New Venture Fund, although the New Venture Fund announced after the October 7 terrorist attacks that it would discontinue all funding to AFGJ, saying "We condemn terrorism and violence against civilians in all forms and do not support any projects or provide any grants to organizations that fund terrorism." In November 2023, the Schmidt Family Foundation, the Ford Foundation, and Arnold Ventures also pledged to discontinue support of the AFGJ. The Tides Foundation did not announce plans to discontinue support of AFGJ.

== National bans and sanctions ==
In 2021, Israel's Defense Ministry designated the association as a terrorist organization, based on recommendations from the Shin Bet and the National Bureau for Counter Terror Financing. The designation alleged that, although its official aim is to assist in securing prisoners' release, it effectively operates as a front for the PFLP abroad.

In November 2023, the association was banned by the Federal Ministry of the Interior of Germany for allegedly distributing candy to celebrate the October 7 attacks and allegedly supporting Hamas and endorsing an incitement of violence.

In September 2025 the Canadian government said that it was "urgently" trying to dissolve the group, with Industry Minister Mélanie Joly saying "It is completely unacceptable that any organization listed as a terrorist entity...continues to exist as a federally registered not-for-profit organization."

Samidoun coordinator Mohammed Khatib was barred from entering the Netherlands in October 2024 to speak at Radboud University. Khatib has called for the "liberation of Palestine, and the liberation of all of us, and the defeat of the E.U., and Zionism, and the U.S. and all of this imperialist capitalist society." On 1 October 2024, the House of Representatives of the Netherlands passed a motion to recommend that Samidoun be designated as a terrorist organization.

Meta Platforms and YouTube have blocked some of the organization's online platforms, citing breaches of their community guidelines.

On 15 October 2024, in a joint action, the Government of Canada declared Samidoun a terrorist entity, and the US Department of the Treasury sanctioned Samidoun as a Specially Designated National. (Note: The SDN status is distinct from the Foreign Terrorist Organization status; that is, the United States did not designate Samidoun a terrorist organization. The United States sanctioned Samidoun for alleged association with terrorist organizations, calling Samidoun a "sham charity." Samidoun is on the SDN list under the Specially Designated Global Terrorist program, which includes both organizations considered capable of terrorism and their alleged associates.)

Samidoun is otherwise restricted by the following states:

- Germany (banned since 2 November 2023)
- United States (sanctioned since 15 October 2024)

In the sanctions initiated in 2024 by the United States, Samidoun was characterized as, "...a sham charity that serves as an international fundraiser for the Popular Front for the Liberation of Palestine (PFLP) terrorist organization", in the official press release from the United States Department of the Treasury.

Leaders of at least one nation have announced they intend to ban Samidoun:

- Belgium

In July 2025, Belgian Prime Minister Bart De Wever introduced legislation to ban groups including the Muslim Brotherhood and Samidoun, saying they "glorify terrorist groups and their atrocities". On August 6, the government revoked the refugee status of Samidoun's European leader, Mohammed Khatib, who had been classified as a "hate preacher".

== See also ==
- 2024 pro-Palestinian protests on university campuses
- List of designated terrorist groups
