= Arabella Advisors =

American for-profit consulting company

- Arabella Advisors Holdings LLC
- Formation: 2005; 21 years ago
- Founder: Eric Kessler
- Dissolved: November 2025; 1 year ago
- Legal status: Acquired by Sunflower Services
- Purpose: Philanthropic consulting
- Headquarters: Washington, D.C.
- Affiliations: Sixteen Thirty Fund; Hopewell Fund; New Venture Fund; Windward Fund; North Fund; Telescope Fund
- Budget: $1.3 billion (2023)
- Website: arabellaadvisors.com

Arabella Advisors, now operating as Sunflower Services, is a Washington, D.C.–based limited liability corporation that advises left-leaning donors and nonprofits about where to give money and manages several dark money groups supportive of the Democratic Party and the progressive movement. It was founded in 2005 by former Clinton administration appointee Eric Kessler. Between Arabella's founding in 2005 and 2021, Arabella raised $6.5 billion, the vast majority of which flowed to policy and litigation groups on the left.

Organizations incubated by and affiliated with Arabella Advisors include the Sixteen Thirty Fund, the New Venture Fund, the Hopewell Fund, the Windward Fund, the North Fund, and the Telescope Fund. These groups have been active in various efforts to oppose the Trump administration and to organize opposition to numerous Republican politicians and policies.

In November 2025, Arabella Advisors announced that it was rebranding to Sunflower Services, a new entity that will continue managing fiscal sponsorships for progressive advocacy groups. According to the Washington Free Beacon, "Under the rebrand, things will remain functionally the same for Arabella's dark money network, including the New Venture Fund, Windward Fund, and Hopewell Fund." The Chronicle of Philanthropy wrote that "This change marks a significant shift for the consultancy world, in which Arabella was among the best-known and most controversial entities of its kind."

== Structure and funding ==
=== Founding and expansion ===
Arabella Advisors was founded in 2005 in Washington, D.C., by Eric Kessler as a limited liability corporation. Kessler's family owned Fel-Pro, an auto parts manufacturer in the Chicago area, and after selling the company for $750 million in 2005, he worked for the Family Alliance Foundation, a philanthropic organization formed with some of the proceeds of the sale. Kessler has also worked for the League of Conservation Voters, was a United States Department of the Interior appointee during the presidency of Bill Clinton, and spent six years working for the National Democratic Institute prior to founding Arabella Advisors. After the initial D.C. founding, Kessler quickly expanded the reach of the firm to Chicago with Bruce Boyd.

=== Fiscal sponsorships ===
Arabella Advisors and its affiliated entities utilize tax regulations in which groups who use a fiscal sponsorship arrangement do not have to file a Form 990 with the Internal Revenue Service. Using "pass-through" arrangements, funding is passed from one organization to another, making it difficult to trace where a donor's money ends up.

=== Revenue, finances, and donors ===
In 2018, the Sixteen Thirty Fund, the New Venture Fund, the Hopewell Fund, and the Windward Fund had combined revenue of $635 million. According to OpenSecrets, in 2018 the Sixteen Thirty Fund had "thirteen multi-million dollar secret donors." One donor gave $51.7 million to the group in 2018, while another donor gave $26.7 million and a third gave $10 million. The group is not required by law to reveal its donors and it has not disclosed who its funders are. Known donors to the group include Nick Hanauer, the American Federation of Teachers, and the Wyss Foundation. Michael Bloomberg gave $250,000 to a super PAC linked to the Sixteen Thirty Fund, and Democratic donor group Democracy Alliance, whose members include billionaire George Soros, has recommended that donors give generously to the Sixteen Thirty Fund.

The Arabella network spent nearly $1.2 billion in 2020 and raised $1.6 billion that same year.

Between 2020 and 2021, the New Venture Fund and the Windward Fund directed $473,000 to the Alliance for Global Justice, a group which funds and organizes anti-Israel protests across the United States. Following the 2023 Hamas-led attack on Israel in October 2023, the Washington Examiner reported on the ties between the Alliance for Global Justice and the Popular Front for the Liberation of Palestine. Soon after, the New Venture Fund and Windward Fund announced they would no longer provide funding to the Alliance for Global Justice due to its ties to Palestinian terrorist groups.

In 2022, Arabella raised $1.3 billion and spent $900 million.

In May 2023, Arabella laid off 10% of its workforce. In July 2023, the company announced that CEO Rick Cruz would depart on August 1.

The New York Times wrote in August 2025 that the Gates Foundation, which is America's largest foundation, had "quietly ceased backing" a network of organizations associated with Arabella and specifically, that it would cease "making grants to nonprofit funds administered by the consulting firm Arabella Advisors". The Gates Foundation had been one of the earliest and largest funders to the Arabella network, providing $450 million in funding over sixteen years. The Gates Foundation's decision inspired alarm in some organizations that have been fiscally sponsored through the Arabella network and "has sparked unease in the world of progressive philanthropy."

According to The Atlantic, Arabella Advisors has "undeniably benefited from the rush of panicked political giving on the left during the Trump years". In 2020, the Sixteen Thirty Fund donated $410 million toward defeating Trump and winning Democratic control of the U.S. Senate. Because of its legal structure, Arabella Advisors and its affiliated groups are not required to disclose their donors, and they have not opted to do so. Billionaires George Soros and Pierre Omidyar have disclosed multi-million donations to the network. Politico has described the Sixteen Thirty Fund as a "left-leaning, secret-money group", writing that the group "illustrates the extent to which the left embraced the use of 'dark money' to fight for its causes in recent years. After decrying big-money Republican donors over the last decade, as well as the Supreme Court rulings that flooded politics with more cash, Democrats now benefit from hundreds of millions of dollars of undisclosed donations as well."

=== Strategy and reception ===
According to Politico, the Sixteen Thirty Fund's activities are "a sign that Democrats and allies have embraced the methods of groups they decried as 'dark money' earlier this decade, when they were under attack from the money machines built by conservatives including the Kochs".

In March 2025, Capital Research Center (CRC) president Scott Walter briefed senior White House officials on a range of liberal and Democratic donors, nonprofits, and fundraising techniques, including Arabella Advisors. Walter is the author of a book about Arabella Advisors, Arabella: The Dark Money Network of Leftist Billionaires Secretly Transforming America, published in 2023. Of the White House briefing, Kenneth Vogel of The New York Times wrote that "A small group of White House officials has been working to identify targets and vulnerabilities inside the Democratic ecosystem, taking stock of previous efforts to investigate them" and that "The president and his allies in Congress are targeting the financial, digital and legal machinery that powers the Democratic Party and much of the progressive political world." According to The Wall Street Journal, a focus of Walter's briefing was on nonprofits that CRC alleges have promoted views tied to Hamas and are supported by foreign donors.

== The Sixteen Thirty Fund ==
The Sixteen Thirty Fund is a liberal nonprofit headquartered in Washington D.C. Because it is a nonprofit, the Sixteen Thirty Fund is not required to disclose its donors, even though it spends significant amounts on politics. As of 2019, it had spent $141 million on more than 100 left-leaning and Democratic causes, making it a large source of money for nonprofits pushing a variety of changes to state and federal law. The Atlantic called the Sixteen Thirty Fund "the indisputable heavyweight of Democratic dark money," noting that it was the second-largest super-PAC donor in 2020, donating $61 million of "effectively untraceable money to progressive causes."

The Sixteen Thirty Fund supports Democratic lawmakers and candidates and criticizes Republicans. The group spent money opposing the nomination of Supreme Court Justice Brett Kavanaugh and other Trump judicial nominees and supporting various ballot measures.

The Sixteen Thirty Fund was behind several groups that ran issue advocacy ads to benefit Democrats during the 2018 midterms. The group also funded Demand Justice, which spent millions of dollars on ads attacking Brett Kavanaugh's nomination to the U.S. Supreme Court. According to OpenSecrets, the Sixteen Thirty Fund and New Venture Fund "have fiscally sponsored at least 80 of their own groups, bankrolling those entities in a way that leaves almost no paper trail."

The Sixteen Thirty Fund was active in the battle for the House of Representatives in 2018, assisting "Democrats trying to seize back power after Trump's rise." According to Politico, "The election featured dozens of Democratic candidates who decried the influence of money in politics on the campaign trail."

The Sixteen Thirty Fund operates under dozens of different trade names with titles like Arizonans United for Health Care, Floridians for a Fair Shake, Michigan Families for Economic Prosperity, and North Carolinians for a Fair Economy. These groups have collectively spent millions of dollars to pressure Republican members of Congress on their stances on health care and economic issues through advertising and activism.

The Sixteen Thirty Fund spent almost $11 million in the 2018 Colorado elections on ballot measures, lobbying, and Democratic super PACs.

In 2019, the fund raised $137 million.

The Sixteen Thirty Fund spent $410 million in 2020, largely focused on helping Democrats defeat President Donald Trump and winning back control of the United States Senate. The group financed attack ads against Trump and vulnerable Republican senators and funded various issue advocacy campaigns. Funding went to groups opposing Trump's Supreme Court nominees, supporting liberal ballot measures and policy proposals at the state level, and opposing Republican tax and health care policies. The Sixteen Thirty Fund gave $10.5 million to the conservative anti-Trump group Defending Democracy Together, which was founded by Bill Kristol in 2018.

In 2020, the Sixteen Thirty Fund raised $390 million, with half of that amount coming from just four donors. Billionaire Pierre Omidyar disclosed that he gave the group $45 million that same year. The group also received mystery donations as large as $50 million and disseminated grants to more than 200 groups. It gave $0.5 million to the group Colorado Families First to support a proposed ballot initiative requiring paid family leave in the state.

== New Venture Fund ==
The New Venture Fund had revenue of $405 million in 2018, up from $350 million annually in the three preceding years. According to OpenSecrets, the New Venture Fund "has fiscally sponsored at least 80 groups and acted as a pass-through agency funneling millions of dollars in grants for wealthy donors to opaque groups with minimal disclosure."

== Windward Fund ==
Founded in 2015, the Windward Fund shared $715 million in 2019 with the New Venture and Hopewell funds. Windward is a 501(c)(3) tax-deductible charity. Windward hosts several charities, including the Heartland Fund and Rewiring America. The Windward Fund gave $2.2 million to a group working to ban gas stoves.

== Projects and funding recipients ==
=== Demand Justice ===
Demand Justice is a courts-focused group headed by former Hillary Clinton press secretary Brian Fallon. The group spent millions of dollars opposing Brett Kavanaugh's confirmation to the U.S. Supreme Court. The group "projected a video of Christine Blasey Ford accusing Kavanaugh of assault on the side of a truck outside a Washington gala where Kavanaugh was speaking."

=== Fix the Court ===
The New Venture Fund provides all of the funding for Fix the Court, a judicial advocacy group that seeks reform of the U.S. federal court system. When Brett Kavanaugh was nominated to the U.S. Supreme Court, Fix the Court bought several Internet domain names related to Kavanaugh and redirected them to websites including End Rape On Campus, the National Sexual Violence Resource Center, and the Rape, Abuse & Incest National Network. Fix the Court's executive director, Gabe Roth, said he purchased and redirected the websites because he believed the sexual assault allegations made by Christine Blasey Ford against Brett Kavanaugh and by Anita Hill against Clarence Thomas.

=== Defend American Democracy ===
Defend American Democracy spent six figures on television advertisements pressuring Republican members of Congress to vote to impeach President Donald Trump for what they called "abusing his office and risking national security for his own gain." This group "primarily targets swing-district Republicans, prominently features military veterans in its ads and presents itself as a veterans group to local media outlets." OpenSecrets reported that "A veterans group urging Republican lawmakers to 'put country over politics' amid the impeachment inquiry into President Donald Trump is the project of a well-funded liberal 'dark money' network." Defend American Democracy's advertisements contained disclaimers that they were "paid for by a group called Protect the Investigation. But Protect the Investigation doesn't legally exist — it's one of dozens of fictitious names registered by the Sixteen Thirty Fund."

=== The Hub Project ===
The Hub Project was started in 2015 with funding from the Wyss Foundation, operated by Swiss billionaire Hansjörg Wyss. The Hub Project seeks "to shape media coverage to help Democratic causes." The goal of The Hub Project is to help Democrats be more effective at conveying their arguments through the news media and directly to voters. It seeks to "dramatically shift the public debate and policy positions of core decision makers." The Hub Project engaged in paid advertising campaigns that criticized Republican congressional candidates in 2018. The Hub Project is housed within the Arabella-sponsored groups the New Venture Fund and the Sixteen Thirty Fund. Between 2007 and 2020, the Wyss Foundation donated approximately $56.5 million to these groups. The New Venture Fund underwrites Acronym, which owns the Courier Newsroom, a group seeking to boost Democratic candidates through local news stories and advertising.

The Hub Project is an initiative that passes on funding to and coordinates 14 groups out of a single office in Washington D.C., "with the goal of battering Republicans for their health care and economic policies during the midterm elections." The Hub Project is run by Obama administration official and public relations specialist Leslie Dach and former Center for American Progress political strategist Arkadi Gerney. The Hub Project "set up an array of affiliate groups around the country, many with vaguely sympathetic names like Keep Iowa Healthy, New Jersey for a Better Future and North Carolinians for a Fair Economy. The Hub Project then used them to mobilize volunteers and run advertising on policy issues against Republican members of Congress many months before the election."

=== America Votes ===
The Sixteen Thirty Fund gave America Votes, which describes itself as "the coordination hub of the progressive community", $27 million in 2018. The $27 million grant was nearly twice the amount America Votes had previously ever raised in a single year.

=== Ballot measures ===
The Sixteen Thirty Fund urged passage of a Nevada ballot measure promoting automatic voter registration and a Michigan redistricting ballot measure. The group also supported a Florida constitutional amendment restoring voting rights to felons and minimum wage increases in Arkansas, Missouri, and other states. The way the groups structure their funding creates "an incomplete picture of where support for candidates and ballot initiatives are coming from" and allows these groups to "avoid public scrutiny by registering trade names to carry out their work. The groups pose as grassroots activist organizations... while being connected to much larger organizations." They adopt 'trade names' meaning voters have little way of knowing who is controlling or funding the organizations until after an election is over. In a 2018 ballot measure campaign in Michigan, a Sixteen Thirty Fund donor group didn't report a "trade name" they had used in a campaign "until 12 days after voters went to the ballots."

=== League of Conservation Voters ===
The Sixteen Thirty Fund gave $8 million to the League of Conservation Voters in 2018.

=== ACRONYM and the Courier Newsroom ===
In 2018, the New Venture Fund gave $250,000 to ACRONYM, described by OpenSecrets (CRP) as "a liberal dark money group with an affiliated super PAC called PACRONYM." As of 2019, ACRONYM was the full owner of Courier Newsroom, a digital for-profit media company which publishes "websites that appear to be free-standing local news outlets" but that are "actually part of a coordinated effort with deep ties to Democratic political operatives." According to the CRP, "Courier has faced scrutiny for exploiting the collapse of local journalism to spread 'hyperlocal partisan propaganda.'"

In 2018, the Sixteen Thirty Fund "sponsored social media pages and digital operations for five pseudo local news outlets." These outlets appeared to be independent but ran nearly identical digital ads. Associated Facebook pages "gave the impression of multiple free-standing local news outlets with unique names and disclaimers...But the sponsors of those ads are merely fictitious names used by the Sixteen Thirty Fund." The Sixteen Thirty Fund is also tied to Supermajority News, whose associated super PAC, Democracy PAC, was created by George Soros in 2019. Democracy PAC gave $1.75 million to PACRONYM, the super PAC arm of ACRONYM. ACRONYM gained notoriety as the majority owner of Shadow Inc., a political technology company whose software failed during the 2020 Iowa Democratic caucuses.

=== COVID-19 pandemic ===
In 2020, the Sixteen Thirty Fund was behind a number of groups that spent millions of dollars on advertisements attacking President Donald Trump's response to the COVID-19 pandemic ahead of the 2020 presidential election.

Arabella Advisors aimed to raise between $8 million and $10 million for the Trusted Elections Fund in case the coronavirus pandemic leads to foreign hacking of voting systems, violence, or contested election results.

== Editing of Wikipedia page ==
In June 2020, the Washington Free Beacon reported that Arabella had hired an editor to request edits to their Wikipedia page and question whether the Free Beacon was a reliable source for material other than opinions.
