= Windward Fund =

- Formation: 2015; 11 years ago
- Type: 501(c)(3) nonprofit
- Headquarters: Washington, D.C.
- Affiliations: Arabella Advisors; Sixteen Thirty Fund; Hopewell Fund; New Venture Fund; North Fund
- Budget: $212 million (2023)
- Website: www.windwardfund.org

The Windward Fund is a 501(c)(3) nonprofit organization that is part of a Democratic "dark money" funding network administered by Arabella Advisors. The Windward Fund serves as the fiscal sponsor for various left-leaning political projects. The Windward Fund had over $158 million in revenue in 2020.

In 2023, after a Washington Examiner investigation revealed that the New Venture Fund and the Windward Fund had given $473,000 between 2020 and 2021 to the Alliance for Global Justice, a group with Palestinian terrorism ties, the New Venture Fund and Windward Fund announced they would discontinue funding of the group.
