= Sher Edling =

Law firm specializing in environmental litigation

Sher Edling LLP
- Headquarters: San Francisco, California
- No. of offices: 1
- No. of attorneys: 25
- Major practice areas: Environmental law, climate change litigation, tort law
- Date founded: 2016
- Founder: Victor Sher; Matthew Edling
- Company type: Limited liability partnership
- Website: www.sheredling.com

Sher Edling LLP is a San Francisco-based law firm that specializes in environmental litigation, particularly climate change litigation, against fossil fuel companies. The firm represents states, cities, counties, tribes, and other governmental entities in lawsuits seeking to hold oil and gas companies financially responsible for climate-related damages and alleged deception about climate change. Sher Edling receives major funding from the New Venture Fund, a nonprofit organization that is part of a Democratic "dark money" network administered by Arabella Advisors.

== History ==
Sher Edling was founded in 2016 by Victor Sher and Matthew Edling with the purpose of pursuing climate-related litigation against fossil fuel companies. The firm helped two California counties and a city file what are considered the nation's first climate deception lawsuits in 2017.

By 2025, Sher Edling had become the dominant law firm in climate litigation against oil companies, representing more than two-thirds of all such lawsuits in the United States.

== Litigation practice ==
Sher Edling represents governmental clients in lawsuits against oil and gas companies including BP, Chevron, ExxonMobil, Shell, ConocoPhillips, and others. The lawsuits allege that these companies engaged in decades-long campaigns to deceive the public about climate science and the role their products play in causing climate change.

The lawsuits invoke claims related to consumer protection, negligence, and public nuisance, rather than directly seeking to regulate greenhouse gas emissions, which would fall under federal jurisdiction under the Clean Air Act. The firm's strategy parallels the tobacco litigation of the 1990s, in which cigarette manufacturers agreed to pay more than $200 billion to states.

== Financial structure ==
=== Contingency fees ===
Sher Edling operates at least some cases on a contingency fee basis with its clients, meaning the firm receives payment only if lawsuits are successful. This arrangement allows governmental clients to pursue litigation without upfront costs. Critics argue that it shifts legal defense costs to energy companies, which pass expenses to consumers through higher energy prices.

=== Government and tribal clients ===
Sher Edling has represented the states of Delaware, Hawai'i, Maine, Minnesota, Rhode Island, New Jersey, and Massachusetts, as well as the District of Columbia; the counties of Maui, Anne Arundel, Santa Cruz, San Mateo, and Marin; the cities of Chicago, Baltimore, Richmond, Santa Cruz, Imperial Beach, San Francisco, Oakland, Annapolis, Honolulu, and New York; and the Shoalwater Bay Indian Tribe and Makah Indian Tribe.

Sher Edling donated $49,000 to the Democratic Attorneys General Association (DAGA), with further donations coming from individual partners. DAGA's leadership at the time of the donations included several attorneys general who had or subsequently hired Sher Edling, including Rob Bonta of California, Keith Ellison of Minnesota, and Kathy Jennings of Delaware. In 2025, lawyers working in the office of Bonta filed a lawsuit against the California State Personnel Board for Bonta's contracting with the firm Lieff Cabraser Heimann & Bernstein to pursue climate cases. The suit stated that Sher Edling, which had also worked with Bonta, billed between $175 and $625 per hour.

== Funding ==
=== New Venture Fund ===
A significant portion of Sher Edling's operational funding comes from 501(c)(3) nonprofit organizations. According to congressional investigations and tax filings, the firm has received substantial funding from the New Venture Fund (NVF), an organization managed by Arabella Advisors, including $3 million in 2021, $2.5 million in 2022, and $2.9 million in 2023. The total donations from the NVF from 2017 through 2025 exceeded $16 million.

A 2024 memorandum by Republican staff of the Senate Commerce Committee and the House Oversight Committee pointed out that these funding arrangements allow donors to receive tax deductions for contributions that ultimately support litigation, whereas direct donations to political candidates or advocacy organizations would not be tax-deductible. "Indeed, not only will Sher Edling receive approximately one-third of any amount it extracts from energy companies if it is somehow successful," alleged the report, "far-left funds are offsetting any risk the firm would otherwise have in pursuing these absurd [legal] claims by bankrolling Sher Edling to the tune of millions of dollars each year."

In November 2025, the American Accountability Foundation filed a complaint with the IRS alleging that the NVF broke tax exemption rules by indirectly funding general operations.

In December 2025, The Washington Free Beacon reported on tax filings of the NVF that show the group simultaneously supporting prosecutors' lawsuits against the oil industry and funding the training of judges potentially presiding over such cases. According to its filings, the NVF funneled $2.3 million in a single year to Sher Edling, which has been hired by numerous Democratic states and cities to sue major oil companies for climate change damages, at the same time that the NVF gave $1.3 million to the Environmental Law Institute (ELI), a legal nonprofit that runs educational seminars for judges on how to handle environmental and climate litigation. According to The Daily Signal, Sher Edling has presented cases before judges trained by the ELI.

According to the Free Beacon, lawyers affiliated with Sher Edling have helped develop ELI curriculum and spoken at their events, and legal experts have simultaneously served on ELI's board while consulting pro bono for Sher Edling. After a July 2025 Fox News report revealed a private online forum ELI had created for judges to discuss climate litigation, ELI removed judge testimonials from its site and shut down the forum. In late 2023, Hawaii Supreme Court Chief Justice Mark E. Recktenwald ruled in Sher Edling's client's favor by allowing its lawsuit against companies like ExxonMobil and Chevron Corporation to proceed. Records show that in the months leading up to the ruling, Recktenwald had participated in ELI-sponsored seminars regarding climate litigation.

=== Other ===
Sher Edling has also received funding from the environmental nonprofit Resources Legacy Fund, the Tides Foundation, the Leonardo DiCaprio Foundation, and the Collective Action Fund for Accountability, Resilience, and Adaptation, which in turn received funding from the MacArthur Foundation, the Hewlett Foundation, the Rockefeller Brothers Fund, and the Gordon and Betty Moore Foundation.

== See also ==
- Climate change litigation
- Environmental law
- Tobacco Master Settlement Agreement
- Public nuisance
- Greenwashing
- Dark money
- Lawfare
