= North Fund =

- Formation: 2018; 8 years ago
- Type: 501(c)(4) nonprofit
- Headquarters: Washington, D.C.
- Affiliations: Arabella Advisors; Sixteen Thirty Fund; Hopewell Fund; New Venture Fund; Windward Fund
- Budget: $59.7 million (revenue) (2023)
- Website: www.northfund.org

The North Fund is a 501(c)(4) "dark money" nonprofit organization managed by Arabella Advisors, a for-profit consulting company that advises left-leaning donors and nonprofits about where to give money. The North Fund serves as the fiscal sponsor for various left-leaning political projects. The North Fund spends significantly on progressive ballot measures. It does not disclose its donors and has fought efforts by government officials to require disclosure of its donors.

According to Axios, which described the North Fund as "shadowy even by the standards of D.C. advocacy groups," the organization's structure and lack of financial transparency "make it the latest progressive nonprofit to operate in ways that obscure key financial information from the public, even as it pushes for legislation to limit the role of so-called dark money in politics."
