= Sixteen Thirty Fund =

American political non-profit

- Formation: 2009; 17 years ago
- Type: 501(c)(4) nonprofit
- Headquarters: Washington, D.C.
- Affiliations: Arabella Advisors; Hopewell Fund; New Venture Fund; Windward Fund; North Fund
- Budget: $389,684,866 (revenue) (2020)
- Website: www.sixteenthirtyfund.org

The Sixteen Thirty Fund is a 501(c)(4) political lobbying organization on the American left characterized as a dark money group. Founded in 2009, it serves as a fiscal sponsor for other organizations, incubating and financing various liberal projects. The Sixteen Thirty Fund is administered by Arabella Advisors, a for-profit consulting firm. The Sixteen Thirty Fund can legally spend up to 49% of its budget on political activities, including transfers to super PACs. Because it is a nonprofit, the Sixteen Thirty Fund is not required to disclose its donors, even though it spends significant amounts on politics.

The group spent money opposing the nomination of Supreme Court Justice Brett Kavanaugh and other Donald Trump judicial nominees and supporting various ballot measures. In 2020, the Sixteen Thirty Fund's $410 million in expenditures focused on helping Democrats defeat Trump and win back control of the United States Senate. The Sixteen Thirty Fund spent $196 million in 2022 on political causes including protecting abortion rights and helping Democrats in the 2022 midterm elections.

Swiss billionaire Hansjörg Wyss has donated $245 million to the Sixteen Thirty Fund and the New Venture Fund since 2016. The Sixteen Thirty Fund gives directly to political committees and pays for TV ads that back specific candidates and causes. In 2022, the FEC said the Sixteen Thirty Fund should be required to register as a political committee, which would require more disclosure. In December 2024, the U.S. House of Representatives held a hearing on the threat of foreign interference in U.S. elections. While federal law prohibits foreign nationals from donating to political candidates, campaigns, or super PACs, there is a loophole allowing foreign nationals to finance ballot measures. The Sixteen Thirty Fund, largely funded by Wyss, has spent over $130 million on ballot measures in 25 states. In the 2024 election cycle alone, the group spent $37 million on ballot measures across the U.S. focused on topics like abortion and election law. After Ohio banned foreign spending on ballot campaigns, the Sixteen Thirty Fund abruptly stopped spending in the state.

== Characterization ==
According to The New York Times, "The Sixteen Thirty is part of a broader network of progressive nonprofits that donors use to fill specific spaces on the political chessboard."

Politico has described the Sixteen Thirty Fund as a "left-leaning, secret-money group", writing that the group "illustrates the extent to which the left embraced the use of 'dark money' to fight for its causes in recent years. After decrying big-money Republican donors over the last decade, as well as the Supreme Court rulings that flooded politics with more cash, Democrats now benefit from hundreds of millions of dollars of undisclosed donations as well." According to Politico, the Sixteen Thirty Fund's activities are "a sign that Democrats and allies have embraced the methods of groups they decried as 'dark money' earlier this decade, when they were under attack from the money machines built by conservatives including the Kochs".

== 2018 election cycle ==
In 2018, the Sixteen Thirty Fund, the New Venture Fund, the Hopewell Fund, and the Windward Fund had combined revenue of $635 million. According to OpenSecrets, in 2018 the Sixteen Thirty Fund had "thirteen multi-million dollar secret donors." One donor gave $51.7 million to the group in 2018, while another donor gave $26.7 million and a third gave $10 million. The group is not required by law to reveal its donors and it has not disclosed who its funders are. Known donors to the group include Nick Hanauer, the American Federation of Teachers, and the Wyss Foundation. Michael Bloomberg gave $250,000 to a super PAC linked to the Sixteen Thirty Fund. Democratic donor group Democracy Alliance, whose members include billionaire George Soros, has recommended that donors give generously to the Sixteen Thirty Fund.

The Sixteen Thirty Fund was behind several groups that ran issue advocacy ads to benefit Democrats during the 2018 midterms. The group also funded Demand Justice, which spent millions of dollars on ads attacking Brett Kavanaugh's nomination to the U.S. Supreme Court. According to OpenSecrets, the Sixteen Thirty Fund and New Venture Fund "have fiscally sponsored at least 80 of their own groups, bankrolling those entities in a way that leaves almost no paper trail."

The Sixteen Thirty Fund was active in the battle for the House of Representatives in 2018, assisting "Democrats trying to seize back power after Trump's rise." According to Politico, "The election featured dozens of Democratic candidates who decried the influence of money in politics on the campaign trail."

The Sixteen Thirty Fund operates under dozens of different trade names with titles like Arizonans United for Health Care, Floridians for a Fair Shake, Michigan Families for Economic Prosperity, and North Carolinians for a Fair Economy. These groups have collectively spent millions of dollars to pressure Republican members of Congress on their stances on health care and economic issues through advertising and activism.

The Sixteen Thirty Fund spent almost $11 million in the 2018 Colorado elections on ballot measures, lobbying, and Democratic super PACs.

As of 2019, the Sixteen Thirty Fund had spent $141 million on more than 100 left-leaning and Democratic causes, making it a large source of money for nonprofits pushing a variety of changes to state and federal law. In 2019, the fund raised $137 million.

== 2020 election cycle ==
The Sixteen Thirty Fund spent $410 million in the 2020 election cycle, which was more than the Democratic National Committee spent. In 2020, the group received mystery donations as large as $50 million and disseminated grants to more than 200 groups. The group's expenditures focused on helping Democrats defeat President Donald Trump and winning back control of the United States Senate. The group financed attack ads against Trump and vulnerable Republican senators and funded various issue advocacy campaigns. Funding went to groups opposing Trump's Supreme Court nominees, supporting liberal ballot measures and policy proposals at the state level, and opposing Republican tax and health care policies. The Sixteen Thirty Fund raised $390 million in 2020, with half of that amount coming from just four donors.

The Sixteen Thirty Fund gave $7 million to a North Carolina group called Piedmont Rising, which ran advertisements attacking Republican U.S. Senator Thom Tillis. According to The New York Times, "Some of the group's ads were designed to look like local news reports from an outlet calling itself the 'North Carolina Examiner.'"

The Atlantic called the Sixteen Thirty Fund "the indisputable heavyweight of Democratic dark money," noting that it was the second-largest super-PAC donor in 2020, donating $61 million of "effectively untraceable money to progressive causes."

In 2020, the Sixteen Thirty Fund gave $10.5 million to the conservative anti-Donald Trump group Defending Democracy Together, which was founded by Bill Kristol in 2018. Defending Democracy Together supported Nikki Haley and ran advertisements against Trump in the 2024 Republican presidential primary in New Hampshire, leading the campaign for Haley to call the organization "an unaffiliated outside group that has nothing to do with our campaign."

In 2020, the Klarman Family Foundation gave the New Venture Fund $16.3 million. New Venture Fund contributed more than $86 million in 2020 to Sixteen Thirty Fund.

== 2022 spending ==
In 2022, the Sixteen Thirty Fund spent $196 million on political causes, including protecting abortion rights and helping Democrats in the 2022 elections. According to NBC News, "The big spending...reflects the massive growth in anonymously funded, big donor-fueled political groups on the left since Donald Trump was elected president in 2016." The majority of the group's $191 million revenue in 2022 came from six anonymous contributors who gave $34.8 million, $19 million, $14.9 million, $12 million, $11.9 million, and $8.5 million, respectively. More than $170 million of the Sixteen Thirty Fund's annual revenue came from 32 donors who gave at least $1 million each.

== 2023 spending ==
The Sixteen Thirty Fund raised $181 million in 2023, a $10 million decline from 2022, but more than a $40 million increase from 2019. Just four donors accounted for two-thirds of the Sixteen Thirty Fund's 2023 revenues, with one donor giving the group $50.5 million, another giving $31.4 million, a third giving $21.8 million, and the last of the top four donors giving $13.6 million. The group spent $141.3 million in 2023, a drop from the previous year, which "is not unusual in odd-numbered years between federal midterm and presidential elections," according to Politico. Politico described the group as "pumping money into a network of other liberal dark money groups supporting Democratic candidates and causes, like fighting climate change and supporting ballot initiatives on abortion access."

== 2024 spending ==
In the 2024 election cycle, the Sixteen Thirty Fund funded efforts to bolster the presidential bid of Robert Kennedy Jr., then, in 2025, spent money trying to prevent his confirmation as United States Secretary of Health and Human Services. Axios wrote that this strategy "shows how the dark money group takes a flexible approach to countering" Trump's agenda.

The Sixteen Thirty Fund spent about $311 million in 2024 funding progressive causes including abortion, expanded voting rights, and climate change. This was more than double what the group spent in 2023. Politico described the Sixteen Thirty Fund as "the left's preeminent dark money hub."

== 2025 spending ==
The Sixteen Thirty Fund provided funding to help launch the Chorus Creator Incubator Program in 2025 to pay Democratic-leaning influencers between $250 to $8,000 per month, according to Taylor Lorenz in Wired. Lorenz wrote that the contracts given to content creators in the program stipulated that they would be removed from the program and barred from future partnerships if they disclosed the partnership without approval. According to her analysis, the contracts offered to creators by Chorus required oversight of all bookings with political leaders and government officials and prohibited using Chorus funds to produce content supporting or criticizing any political candidate or campaign without advance approval. She stated that according to Chorus presentations, this structure would allow them to avoid political advertising disclosure laws. Chorus cofounder Brian Tyler Cohen stated that he disagreed with Lorenz's characterizations and described the initiative as similar to a scholarship program.

== See also ==
- American Bridge 21st Century
- America Votes
- Demand Progress
