= Marc Elias =

American lawyer (born 1969)

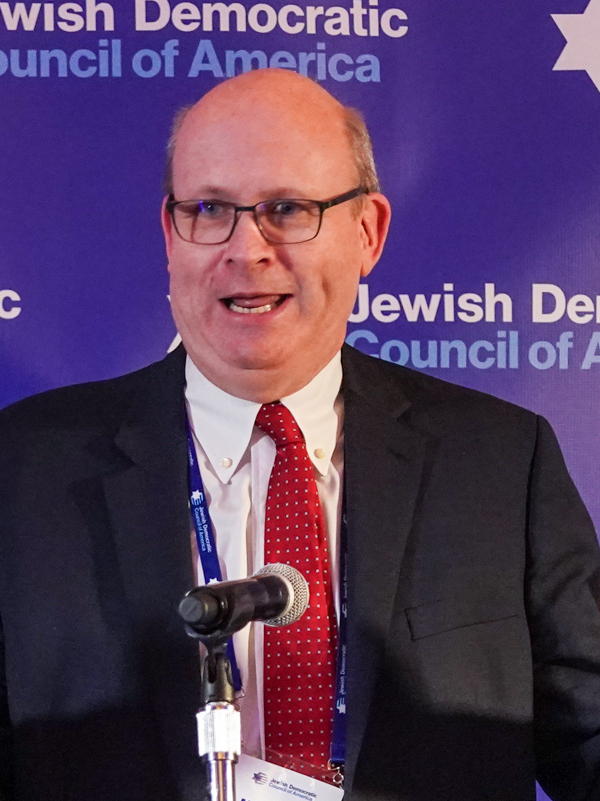
- Elias in 2024
- Born: Marc Erik Elias; February 1, 1969 (age 57); New York City, U.S.
- Education: Hamilton College (BA); Duke University (MA, JD)
- Employers: Democracy Docket (since 2020); Perkins Coie (until 2021); Elias Law Group (since 2021)
- Political party: Democratic

Marc Erik Elias (born February 1, 1969) is an American elections attorney for the Democratic Party. He founded Democracy Docket, a website focused on voting rights and election litigation in the United States, in 2020. He left his position as a partner at Perkins Coie to start the Elias Law Group in 2021. According to The New York Times, "Elias has arguably done more than any single person outside government to shape the Democratic Party and the rules under which all campaigns and elections in the United States are conducted."

Elias served as general counsel for the Hillary Clinton 2016 presidential campaign and John Kerry 2004 presidential campaign. In 2020 and 2021, on behalf of the Biden campaign and the Democratic National Committee, Elias oversaw the state-by-state response to lawsuits filed by the Trump campaign contesting the 2020 presidential election results. Of the 64 cases, he won all but one minor case, which was later overturned in his favor. Elias was hired by the Kamala Harris 2024 presidential campaign to focus on potential recounts and post-election litigation.

== Early life and education ==
Born to a Jewish family in New York City, Elias was raised in Suffern, New York. He earned a Bachelor of Arts in government in 1990 from Hamilton College, at which he attended a class taught by Bernie Sanders. He then earned a master's degree in political science from Duke University and a Juris Doctor from Duke University School of Law.

== Career ==
In 2004, Elias served as general counsel to John Kerry's presidential campaign.

Prior to creating the Elias Law Group in 2021, Elias was the head of the political law practice at Perkins Coie. He represented the Democratic National Committee, Democratic Senatorial Campaign Committee, Democratic Congressional Campaign Committee, Democratic Governors Association, and a number of Democratic members of Congress. He has represented the leadership of the United States House of Representatives and United States Senate. In 2020, Elias's employer, Perkins Coie, received $9.6 million from the Hopewell Fund and $11.6 million from Priorities USA Action. Starting in 2020 Elias led a Hopewell Fund project called the Democracy Docket Legal Fund with the stated goal of supporting litigation to challenge Republican-backed voting restrictions enacted across the country.

He served as lead counsel for Senator Al Franken in the 2008 United States Senate election in Minnesota recount and contest, the longest recount and contest in American history. Elias has testified on campaign finance before committees in both houses of Congress and before the Federal Election Commission. Elias has worked on voting rights and redistricting lawsuits across the U.S.

In 2014, Elias advised Senator Harry Reid "on a provision that was tucked into a must-pass spending bill in 2014 that dramatically increased the amount of cash superrich donors could give to national party committees ... Republicans would later use the funds to pay Mr. Trump's legal fees while he was president, and have since used them to pay for ads."

In April 2015, Hillary Clinton engaged Elias as attorney of record and general counsel for her 2016 presidential campaign. According to The Washington Post, in April 2016, Elias hired Fusion GPS on behalf of the Democratic National Committee and the Clinton campaign to create the research that resulted in the Steele dossier. Elias served as "the point person to fund opposition research that produced salacious – but ultimately largely debunked – claims about Mr. Trump's ties to Russia." Money from his clients, the D.N.C. and the Clinton campaign, was used without their knowledge to pay for the research. On October 24, 2017, Perkins Coie released Fusion GPS from its client confidentiality obligation.

Elias served as the attorney for Dan McCready during the investigation of fraud allegations in the 2018 election in North Carolina's 9th congressional district. In January 2019, Elias became general counsel of the Kamala Harris 2020 presidential campaign.

Following the 2020 presidential election, Elias supervised the response to dozens of lawsuits filed by the Donald Trump campaign seeking to overturn Biden's win. Out of 65 such court cases, Elias prevailed in 64. In 2021, as several Republican-dominated state legislatures passed laws to tighten election procedures and voting requirements, Elias filed suits challenging the new laws, often within hours of the bills being signed. Writing in The Hill, Reid Wilson described Elias as "the most prominent Democratic attorney in America" and "the Democrats' last best hope of preserving a House majority". According to The American Lawyer, Elias has gained a reputation for "strident election and voting rights litigation on behalf of the Democratic Party".

On May 18, 2022, Elias was called to testify by prosecutors for special counsel John Durham at the trial of his former law partner Michael Sussmann, who had been charged with making a false statement to FBI general counsel James Baker during a meeting they had in September 2016. Elias acknowledged hiring Fusion GPS to conduct opposition research against Clinton's opponent Donald Trump, asserting it was part of a larger effort to protect the Clinton campaign from possible libel suits from Trump or others. He said that in representing high-profile political figures, he hired firms that could ensure confidentiality to avoid leaks which might damage his clients. The Durham prosecution called Elias to testify at the outset of the trial, apparently to reinforce what it contended was an effort by Sussmann and the Clinton campaign to draw FBI and press attention to potential communications between computer servers at the Russian Alfa-Bank and the Trump Organization. Instead, Elias' testimony was highly critical of Donald Trump and the FBI's handling of the Trump–Russia probe. CNN reported that, through his testimony, he turned the tables on Durham.

Elias represented the Democratic National Committee from 2009 to 2023; the reasons for the end of his contract with the DNC were described by The New York Times as "murky". In the fall of 2023, Elias was retained by American Bridge 21st Century to vet ballot access efforts by independent and third-party candidates in the 2024 United States presidential election.

In 2024, Elias sued to overturn an Ohio law barring foreign nationals from spending money on ballot measure campaigns. According to The New York Times, "The lawsuit came amid bipartisan national efforts to bar foreign money from influencing ballot campaigns." That same year, Elias petitioned the Federal Election Commission (FEC) to allow a George Soros-funded political action committee to coordinate with Democratic campaigns. The FEC approved the request, which consequently allowed Donald Trump to immediately begin working with groups funded by billionaires like Elon Musk on canvassing operations targeting swing state voters. According to The New York Times, Elias "has played a key role in carving new pathways for big money into the political process and assisting Democrats as they caught up to Republicans in difficult-to-trace unlimited spending, advising their efforts to use so-called dark money to finance voter registration, canvassing, post-election lawsuits – even news outlets".

=== Targeting of Elias and the Elias Law Group by the Trump administration ===
On March 22, 2025, President Donald Trump issued a presidential memorandum, "Preventing Abuses of the Legal System and the Federal Court", targeting lawyers and law firms more generally if they filed "frivolous, unreasonable, and vexatious litigation" against the administration, as judged by the attorney general. A variety of people in the legal profession condemned the memorandum as an attempt to intimidate firms so that they wouldn't take on clients who oppose government actions.

In the memorandum, Trump specifically mentioned the Marc Elias and the Elias Law Group LLP as being "deeply involved in the creation of a false 'dossier' by a foreign national designed to provide a fraudulent basis for Federal law enforcement to investigate a Presidential candidate in order to alter the outcome of the Presidential election" and that "Elias also intentionally sought to conceal the role of his client — failed Presidential candidate Hillary Clinton — in the dossier." Marc Elias spoke openly in opposition to such actions by stating: "President Trump's goal is clear...[h]e wants lawyers and law firms to capitulate and cower until there is no one left to oppose his Administration in court...Elias Law Group will not be deterred from fighting for democracy in court...There will be no negotiation with this White House about the clients we represent or the lawsuits we bring on their behalf."

== Criticism ==
Elias's tactics have been criticized by legal scholar Richard L. Hasen who has written a blog post outlining the differences in approaches to defending election law. Hasen and Elias had previously disagreed on legal tactics.

On March 12, 2021, a three-judge panel of the 5th Circuit Court of Appeals issued sanctions on Elias and other Perkins Coie attorneys for "redundant and misleading" motions related to a case in which Elias and his legal team argued that the elimination of straight-ticket voting in Texas disproportionately affected minorities. In the ruling, the court stated that Elias and his team "did not notify the court that their latest motion to supplement the record filed on February 10, 2021, was nearly identical to the motion to supplement the record filed several months ago by the same attorneys, on September 29, 2020". After the ruling, Perkins Coie defended Elias's actions. In December 2021, Elias asked the full court to reconsider the panel's decision. His attorney Paul Clement claimed that the panel's action was unprecedented and Elias had made good-faith mistakes rather than engaged in egregious misconduct for which appellate courts typically impose sanctions. The court has broad authority to oversee the attorneys who appear before it. The motion was denied by the appeals court.

During a December 2021 episode of his "War Room" podcast, former Trump strategic advisor Steve Bannon said, "One thing about Marc Elias, he's pure evil, but, man, that brother is smart, tough. He's crazy, but he's a fighter, and I admire fighters."

== Bibliography ==
- With Jonathan S. Berkon for the Harvard Law Review: "After McCutcheon" about the Supreme Court of the United States ruling on McCutcheon v. FEC
- "Political Regulation: Justified Reform or a Burden on Free Speech" an article about the increase in political spending since 2000 due to changes in campaign finance law
- "Even Judges Can't Follow Campaign Finance Laws" – an assessment on the trial for David Rosen where Elias asserted that "The Rosen trial confirmed one of the dirty little secrets of the campaign finance laws – they are so complicated that virtually no one in politics fully understands them"
