= Charlotte Kates =

American activist

Charlotte Lynne Kates
- Born: New Jersey
- Education: Rutgers University; Rutgers Law School
- Occupation: Activist
- Known for: Co-founder of Samidoun
- Spouse: Khaled Barakat

Charlotte Kates is an American activist who is the co-founder of Samidoun, a pro-Palestinian advocacy group based in Canada that has been designated as a terrorist group by a number of governments.

== Biography ==
Kates is a New Jersey native and graduate of Rutgers University and Rutgers Law School. As a child, Kates says she was inspired by reading books about the Soviet Union and socialism. She has cited The State and Revolution by Vladimir Lenin as her favorite book. At age 13, she joined the Communist Party USA. She began organizing pro-Palestinian and anti-Israel events while she was in law school. Her organization put up a banner with the phrase "From the River to the Sea, Palestine Will be Free", a political slogan which The New York Times said "meant Israel would be wiped off the map." She is married to Samidoun founder Khaled Barakat. Barakat is considered to be a Popular Front for the Liberation of Palestine (PFLP) leader by the U.S. government. He was deported from the United States in 2003. The couple are banned from entering the European Union. They live in Vancouver, Canada.

Kates was arrested in April 2024 after she praised the October 7 attacks, led a chant of "Long live October 7," and referred to a number of designated terrorist organizations as heroes at a demonstration in Vancouver. As of May 2025, the Canadian government had not decided whether to approve the hate crime charges against Kates.

Kates has said that Hamas and Hezbollah are "not engaging in terrorism" but are "engaging in a national liberation struggle." Kates called the October 7 Hamas terrorist attack "a brave and heroic operation" and said "That is something we stand by 100%." Samidoun, which has been described as "pro-Hamas", has celebrated the October 7 attacks, in which Palestinian militant groups invaded Israel and killed 1,195 people.

Kates traveled to Iran to accept an Islamic Human Rights and Human Dignity Award in August 2024. B'nai Brith Canada is petitioning the Canadian government to deport both Kates and Barakat.
