= New Venture Fund =

American progressive consultation nonprofit

- Formation: 2006; 20 years ago
- Type: 501(c)(3) nonprofit
- Headquarters: Washington, D.C.
- Affiliations: Arabella Advisors; Sixteen Thirty Fund; Hopewell Fund; Windward Fund; North Fund
- Budget: $669 million (revenue) (2023)
- Website: newventurefund.org

The New Venture Fund is a 501(c)(3) nonprofit organization that is part of a Democratic "dark money" network administered by Arabella Advisors. The New Venture Fund serves as the fiscal sponsor for various left-leaning political projects. It has annual revenue of nearly $1 billion.

OpenSecrets, Axios, and The New York Times have described New Venture Fund as a dark money group. According to OpenSecrets, the New Venture Fund "has fiscally sponsored at least 80 groups and acted as a pass-through agency funneling millions of dollars in grants for wealthy donors to opaque groups with minimal disclosure." According to Axios, the New Venture Fund has been "criticized for obscuring information about the scores of subsidiary groups they sponsor."

Swiss billionaire Hansjörg Wyss is a major donor to the New Venture Fund.

The New Venture Fund has given money to Acronym, a partial owner of Courier Newsroom.

In October 2023, a Washington Examiner investigation revealed that the New Venture Fund and the Windward Fund had given $473,000 between 2020 and 2021 to the Alliance for Global Justice, a group with alleged links to the Popular Front for the Liberation of Palestine militant group. New Venture Fund and Windward Fund announced they would discontinue funding the Alliance for Global Justice.

In 2020, the Klarman Family Foundation gave the New Venture Fund $16.3 million.

Washington Free Beacon reporter Thomas Catenacci reviewed the New Venture Fund's 2024 tax filings and found that the New Venture Fund has contributed almost $18 million to the law firm Sher Edling since 2021. Sher Edling has brought close to two dozen lawsuits for Democratic-run states and cities against oil companies, accusing them of causing global warming and extreme changes in the weather. In 2024, the New Venture Fund contributed $1.3 million to the Environmental Law Institute, a D.C.-based nonprofit that trains judges how to handle climate litigation. Catenacci writes that this is a clear indication of the fund's objective to target the oil industry through the legal system: by funding lawyers bringing the cases against the oil companies in an attempt to bankrupt them through legal fees and by providing training to judges whose views may coincide with those lawyers.
