= Alliance for Global Justice =

American non-profit fiscal sponsor

- Formation: 1998; 28 years ago
- Purpose: Fiscal sponsorship
- Headquarters: Tucson, Arizona
- President: James Jordan
- Affiliations: Samidoun
- Budget: $8.82 million (2024)
- Website: afgj.org

The Alliance for Global Justice (AFGJ) is a nonprofit group based in Arizona that serves as the fiscal sponsor for 150 other groups around the world, including Samidoun. AFGJ has attracted controversy due to its sponsorship of Samidoun, which has been designated as a terrorist group by several governments. AFGJ has been de-platformed from a number of financial platforms due to its connection to Samidoun. Major donors to AFGJ have included the New Venture Fund and the Tides Foundation, although the New Venture Fund announced that after the October 7, 2023, Hamas terrorist attack, it would cease supporting AFGJ.

== Fiscal sponsorship of Samidoun ==
As the fiscal sponsor for Samidoun, AGFJ and Samidoun are legally indistinguishable. In October 2024, the U.S. Treasury Department sanctioned Samidoun as a "sham charity" that had provided material support to a Palestinian terrorist organization that participated in the October 7 Hamas terrorist attacks. Canada and Israel both label the group a terrorist entity. Samidoun has ties to the Popular Front for the Liberation of Palestine, which fielded militants during the October 7 massacres.

== Funding ==
In 2021, the AFGJ had more than $6.2 million in assets and spent more than $54 million. The Park Foundation is one of the group's donors.

In 2021, the Tides Foundation and the New Venture Fund gave more than $9 million to the AFGJ. Tides provided $286,000 to AFGJ in 2023. After the October 7, 2023, Hamas terrorist attack, the New Venture Fund announced that it would be "discontinuing grants to any projects hosted by the Alliance for Global Justice," saying "We condemn terrorism and violence against civilians in all forms and do not support any projects or provide any grants to organizations that fund terrorism." In November 2023, the Schmidt Family Foundation, the Ford Foundation, and Arnold Ventures also pledged to discontinue support of the AFGJ. The Tides Foundation did not announce plans to discontinue support of AFGJ.

== Investigations ==
In October 2024, the United States House Committee on Ways and Means sent letters to the attorneys general of six states recommending that a number of organizations, including AFGJ, have their tax-free status investigated for "fueling antisemitism and/or having suspected ties to foreign terrorist organizations." That same year, the Anti-Defamation League urged the attorney generals of New York and Arizona to investigate the AFGJ for potential violations of federal law.

== Removal from financial platforms ==
Since 2019, various financial platforms, including American Express, PayPal, Donorbox, Plaid, and Discover, have stopped processing funding for Samidoun and the AFGJ, "citing fears of relations to terror activity." In February 2023, the AFGJ announced that the company that handled its credit card transactions had blocked its ability to process donations due to allegations that Samidoun was serving as a front for the PFLP - a leftist Palestinian militant group designated by the U.S. State Department, Canada, and the EU as a terrorist organization.
