= Capital Research Center =

American conservative organization

Coordinates: 38.9102°N 77.0361°W

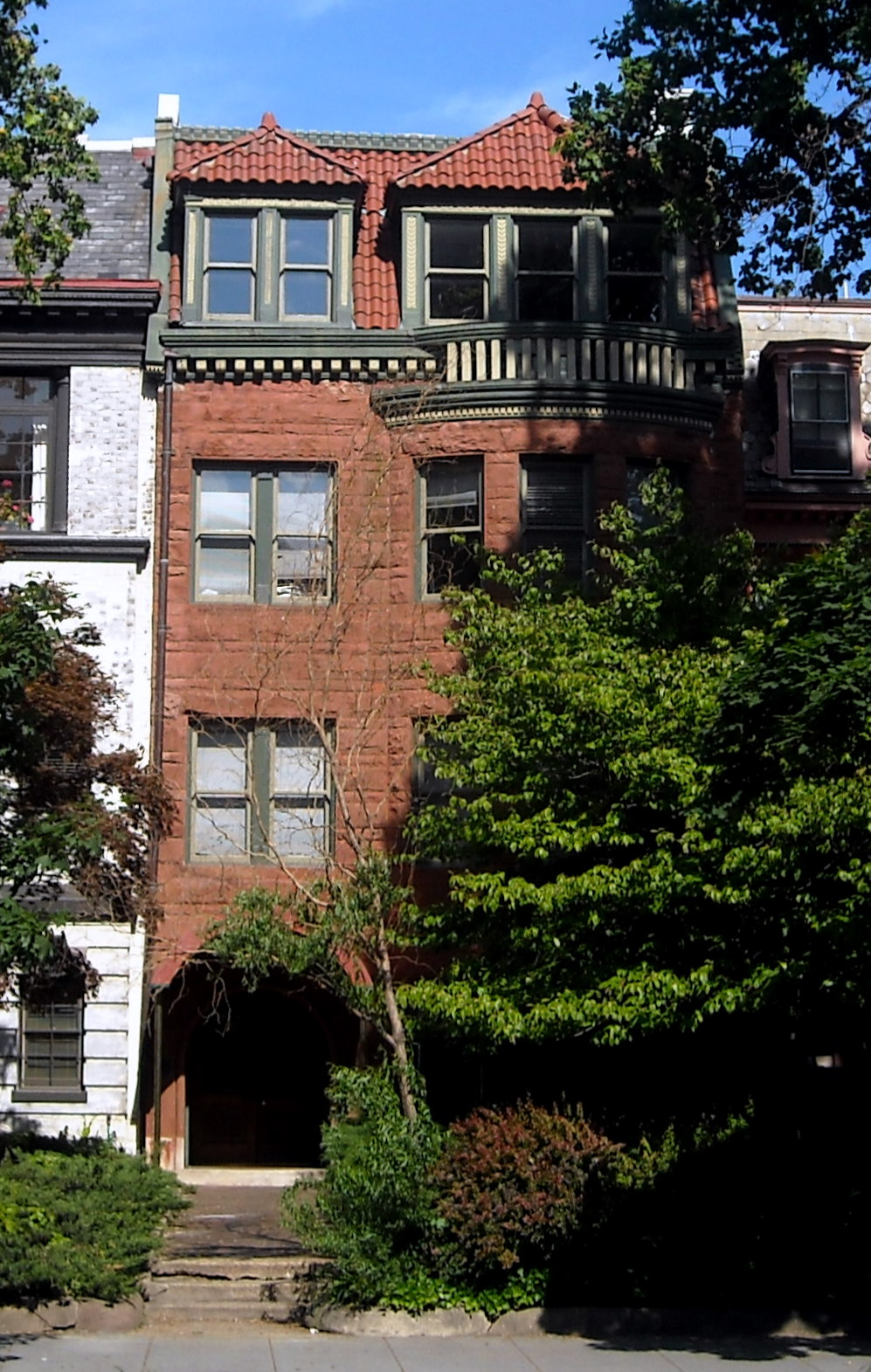
- Capital Research Center's headquarters in Washington, D.C.
- Formation: 1984
- Founder: Willa Johnson
- Type: Nonprofit organization
- Headquarters: Washington, D.C., U.S.
- Official language: English
- Revenue: $7.52 million (2024)
- Expenses: $7.95 million (2024)
- Endowment: $12.4 million
- Website: www.capitalresearch.org

Capital Research Center (CRC) is an American conservative 501(c)(3) non-profit watchdog group located in Washington, D.C., that monitors liberal money in politics. Its stated purpose is to "study non-profit organizations, with a special focus on reviving the American traditions of charity, philanthropy, and voluntarism". CRC monitors the giving of major liberal donors in the U.S. and has done extensive research into nonprofits funded by left-leaning donors. A 2026 profile in Politico entitled "A small conservative group rises in influence under Trump 2.0" noted that Republicans are increasingly using CRC's work in their investigations into nonprofit organizations, specifically highlighting CRC's research on pro-Palestinian, climate advocacy, and voter registration groups.

== History ==
CRC was founded in 1984 by Willa Johnson, former senior vice president of The Heritage Foundation, deputy director of the Office of Presidential Personnel in the first term of the Reagan administration, and a legislative aide in both the United States Senate and House of Representatives. Journalist and author Marvin Olasky previously served as a senior fellow at CRC. According to a 1997 article in The Washington Post, CRC also discourages donations by corporations and non-profits supporting what it sees as liberal or anti-business policies.

In 2011, Politico reported that CRC had received millions of dollars from conservative philanthropists over the years, with a total budget in 2009 of $1.4 million. CRC reported contributions and grants totaling $7.46 million in 2023.

CRC president Scott Walter, a former advisor to President George W. Bush, is also the author of the book Arabella: The Dark Money Network of Leftist Billionaires Secretly Transforming America, published in 2023, about the liberal strategic consulting firm Arabella Advisors.

In March 2025, Walter briefed senior White House officials on a range of liberal and Democratic donors, nonprofits, and fundraising techniques, including ActBlue and Arabella Advisors. Of the White House briefing, Kenneth Vogel of The New York Times wrote that a "small group of White House officials has been working to identify targets and vulnerabilities inside the Democratic ecosystem, taking stock of previous efforts to investigate them" and that President Donald Trump and "his allies in Congress" are "targeting the financial, digital and legal machinery that powers the Democratic Party and much of the progressive political world". According to The Wall Street Journal, a focus of Walter's briefing was on nonprofits that CRC alleges have promoted views tied to Hamas and are supported by foreign donors. According to a June 2026 article in Politico, Walter says that "administration officials regularly text and email him asking for briefings and information about CRC's research."

== InfluenceWatch ==
In 2017, the CRC launched the website InfluenceWatch, an online encyclopedia of donors, nonprofits, and political influencers.

In 2026, CRC president Scott Walter was quoted as saying "When I talk to Hill committees, I always ask if they know InfluenceWatch. One Senate committee staffer laughed and said, 'Scott, when I open my browser, a tab with InfluenceWatch opens.'"

== Film production ==
CRC has a film production arm called Dangerous Documentaries, which partially funded No Safe Spaces by Adam Carolla and radio host Dennis Prager, about political correctness on college campuses.
