= Hopewell Fund =

US nonprofit organization

- Formation: 2015; 11 years ago
- Type: 501(c)(3) nonprofit
- Headquarters: Washington, D.C.
- President: Anna Bower
- Affiliations: Sunflower Services; New Venture Fund; Windward Fund
- Budget: $208 million (revenue) (2024)
- Website: www.hopewellfund.org

The Hopewell Fund is a liberal nonprofit organization that is part of a network of anonymous donors connected with Democratic Party-friendly initiatives, administered by Sunflower Services, previously known as Arabella Advisors. The Hopewell Fund serves as the fiscal sponsor for various left-leaning political projects. The Hopewell Fund spent over $127 million in 2020, and is one of the five largest nonprofits associated with the Democratic Party.

== History ==
The Hopewell Fund was established in 2015. The next year, Hopewell was a fiscal sponsor of the Economic Security Project, a nonprofit co-founded by Chris Hughes that promotes guaranteed basic income. That same year, Hopewell became a fiscal sponsor of the NFL Players Coalition, a non-profit advocacy group co-founded by NFL players Malcolm Jenkins and Anquan Boldin. This group was established to administer an $89 million, seven-year commitment by the National Football League toward social justice and racial equality initiatives.

From 2017 to 2019, the Hopewell Fund incubated States Newsroom, a state-focused nonprofit news organization, by providing administrative and business support. Hopewell also registered the names of multiple outlets affiliated with the States Newsroom. According to OpenSecrets, "The Hopewell Fund gave $1.72 million to an organization called News for Democracy that was at the crux of a network of seemingly independent Facebook pages disguised as news outlets that started spending on digital ads in 2018." In 2020, OpenSecrets described these types of activities as "some of the biggest coordinated efforts using pseudo news for political gain discovered to date."

In 2020, Hopewell began fiscally sponsoring the Rare Impact Fund, a mental health-focused initiative from Selena Gomez's Rare Beauty cosmetic brand. That same year, Hopewell distributed more than $127 million, and its grantmaking included major support for media, turnout, and advocacy projects associated with progressive politics. Hopewell Fund provided more than $8 million to Acronym, a progressive non-profit co-founded by Tara McGowan. The Hopewell Fund also sponsored Democracy Docket, a voting rights and media platform founded by lawyer Marc Elias, and awarded nearly $3.8 million to Family Planning Associates Medical Group, a Chicago clinic that provides abortion services, $2 million to a Tulane University fund, and $1 million to Vote Forward, a voter registration project targeting underrepresented populations.

A 2022 analysis by The New York Times found that the Hopewell Fund "gave $8.1 million to a dark-money group called Acronym, which spent millions of dollars on Facebook advertising and backed a company called Courier Newsroom that published articles favoring Democrats and received millions of dollars from dark money groups." The Hopewell Fund sponsored Democracy Docket, a liberal-leaning voting rights and media platform founded by lawyer Marc Elias. In 2023, Hopewell launched the Heat Initiative, an advocacy group that campaigns against Apple's end-to-end encryption, arguing it aids child exploitation. That same year, Forbes Tate Partners registered to lobby for the Hopewell Fund on the availability of Food and Drug Administration-approved drugs related to abortion care.

In September 2025, the Hopewell Fund brought on Anna Brower as its inaugural president. In November 2025, Hopewell Fund, New Venture Fund, and Windward Fund created a new public benefit corporation called Sunflower Services. Sunflower Services operates as a vendor to these nonprofits, in addition to being owned and governed by them. Sunflower purchased the part of Arabella Advisors that previously serviced fiscal sponsors. In 2026, the New York Times reported on Hopewell Fund support for States at the Core, a group providing training on how to track and document the actions of federal ICE agents. That same year, the Hopewell Fund was a signatory on a petition asking Fidelity Charitable, Vanguard Charitable, and DAFgiving360 to restore the ability of donors to make grants to the Southern Poverty Law Center (SPLC) after the SPLC was indicted on charges of committing financial crimes.

== Structure and funding ==
Hopewell Fund is a Washington D.C.-based nonprofit corporation with 501(c)(3) public-charity status. Inside Philanthropy described its focus as "social entrepreneurship". Prominent project areas include civil rights, education access, reproductive health, and voter registration. Hopewell was previously part of a broader fiscal-sponsorship services ecosystem affiliated with Arabella Advisors. In 2025, Hopewell Fund, along with New Venture Fund and Windward Fund, created Sunflower Services, a public benefit corporation, which then acquired Arabella Advisors' fiscal-sponsorship servicing business. Financial backers of the Hopewell Fund include Swiss billionaire Hansjörg Wyss, LinkedIn founder Reid Hoffman, Iranian-American billionaire and eBay founder Pierre Omidyar, and Hungarian-American billionaire George Soros.
