= Klarman Family Foundation =

Private foundation of the Klarman family

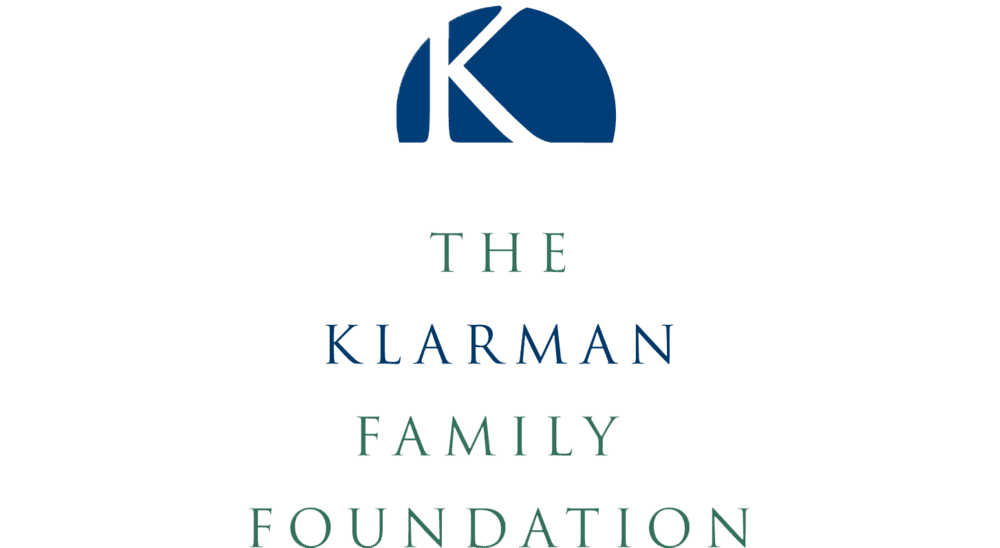
- Formation: 1990
- Founders: Seth Klarman; Beth Schultz Klarman
- Type: Private foundation
- Headquarters: Boston, Massachusetts, U.S.
- Revenue: $74,495,257 (2024)
- Expenses: $105,297,791 (2024)
- Website: klarmanfoundation.org

The Klarman Family Foundation is a private foundation established by Seth Klarman and Beth Schultz Klarman in 1990. The foundation donates to center-left political causes and organizations associated with the Democratic Party, as well as groups supporting the Jewish diaspora, Israel, and advancements in medical research. Since its founding, the foundation has disbursed almost $900 million in grants.

== History ==
The Klarman Family Foundation was founded in 1990 by billionaire investor Seth Klarman and his wife, Beth Schultz Klarman, who serves as the foundation's president. Headquartered in Boston, Massachusetts, the foundation became a nonprofit organization in 1991, giving it tax-exempt status. The foundation originally focused primarily on advancements in medical research and support for the Jewish diaspora and Israel, though it has given substantially to center-left and Democratic-aligned organizations since 2016. In 2021, the Klarman Family Foundation donated over $82 million, up from $80.75 million the previous year. Since its founding, the foundation has disbursed over 4,000 grants with a total value of over $876 million.

== Activities ==
=== Medical research and wellbeing ===
The Klarman Family Foundation has invested significant amounts in research on eating disorders, particularly anorexia nervosa. The foundation established the Anorexia Nervosa Genetics Initiative, which seeks to improve prevention and treatment of eating disorders. In 2012, the foundation issued a $32.5 million grant to the Broad Institute, helping establish the Klarman Cell Observatory, which studies cellular processes.

The Klarman Family Foundation has partnered with local nonprofits in Massachusetts to improve "the health and well-being of individuals and families" in the state. The foundation established the TEAM UP Center at Boston University, an initiative supporting health care at pediatric primary care clinics, as well as the Instrument Fund, which helps increase access to musical instruments among low-income youth in Massachusetts. In 2019, the foundation gave $2 million to Year Up, a nonprofit focused on education and job skills. The foundation has invested significantly in medical research and advancements in Israel.

In 2019, the foundation announced collaborative funding with the Chan Zuckerberg Initiative and The Leona M. and Harry B. Helmsley Charitable Trust to support ethical biomedical research and the Human Cell Atlas, an initiative to map all cells in the human body, at McGill University's Centre for Genomics and Policy.

=== Higher education ===
Interior of Harvard Business School's Klarman Hall (2025)

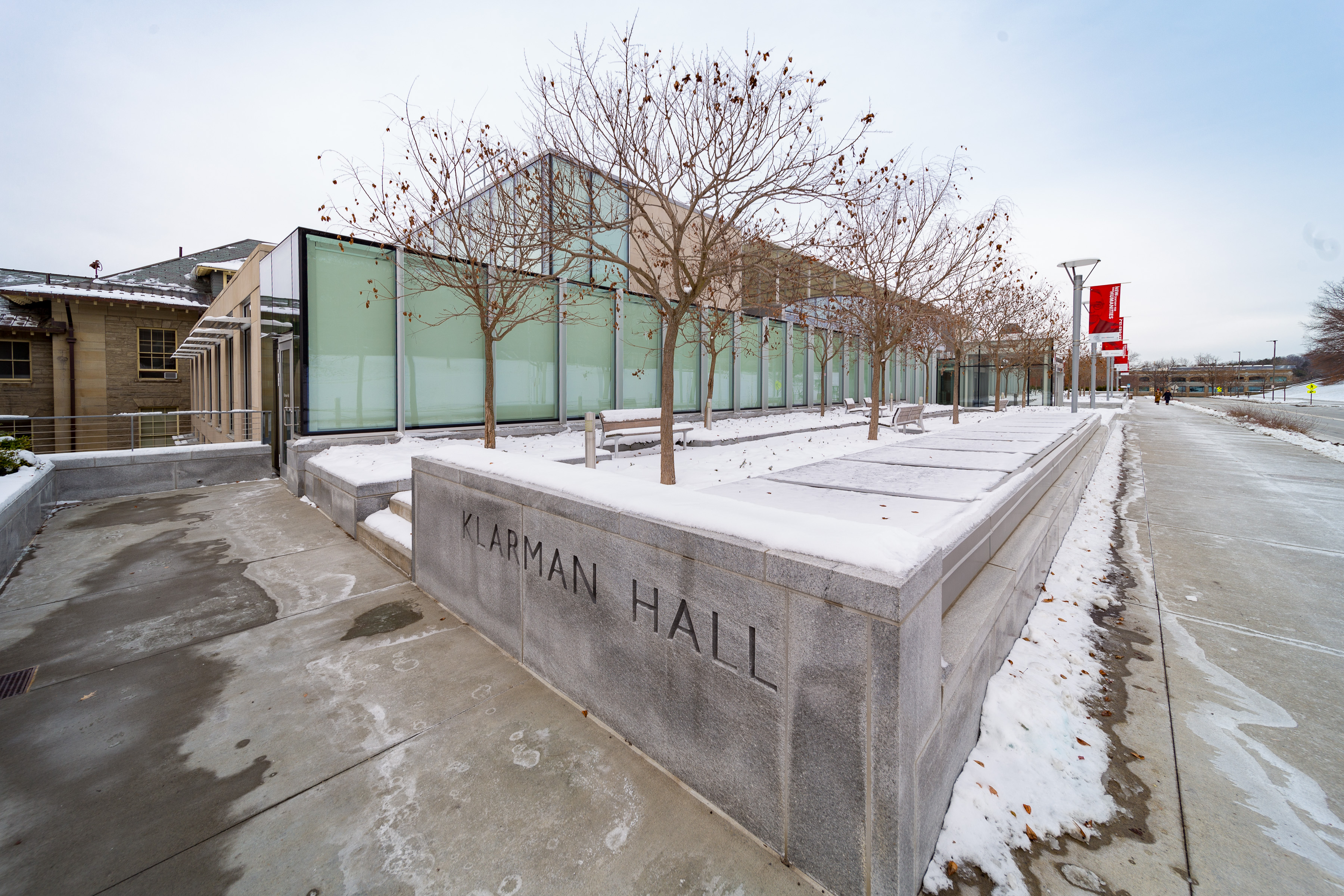
Exterior of Cornell University's Klarman Hall (2019)

The foundation supports multiple scholarships for undergraduates at Cornell University, Klarman's alma mater. In 2009, Cornell announced that the Klarman Family Foundation had committed to a "five-year $5 million" donation commitment. In 2013, Cornell began working on Klarman Hall (officially the Seth '79 and Beth Klarman Humanities Building), a $61 million project funded primarily by the foundation.

In 2014, Harvard Business School announced plans for a conference center and performance space, also named Klarman Hall, after receiving a donation from the Klarman Family Foundation. While neither Harvard nor the foundation revealed the donation amount, Key Executives claimed that the foundation had gifted $120 million to the university.

=== Jewish community and Israel ===
The Klarman Family Foundation has supported the Jewish community in both the United States and Israel. The foundation has given to Boston's Beth Israel Deaconess Medical Center as well as the Jerusalem Academy of Music and Dance. The foundation has invested in initiatives to reduce antisemitism and improve the lives of Arab-Israelis. The foundation has donated more than $2 million to the United States Holocaust Memorial Museum, and has funded Cornell University's Hillel campus.

In 2019, Klarman Family Foundation donations included $500,000 to the Shalom Hartman Institute of North America and $200,000 to Keshet, an LGBTQ Jewish organization. In 2020, the foundation gave $2,000,000 to Facing History and Ourselves, a nonprofit that "use[s] lessons of history to challenge teachers and their students to stand up to bigotry and hate" and seeks to increase awareness about racial segregation and the Holocaust. The foundation also donated $1,500,000 to American Jewish World Service, a human rights organization, and $1,050,000 to the Anti-Defamation League.

In 2023, the Klarman Family Foundation partnered with the Rothschild family's Yad Hanadiv foundation to launch a $100 million program aiming to increase the number of physician-researchers in Israel.

=== United States politics ===
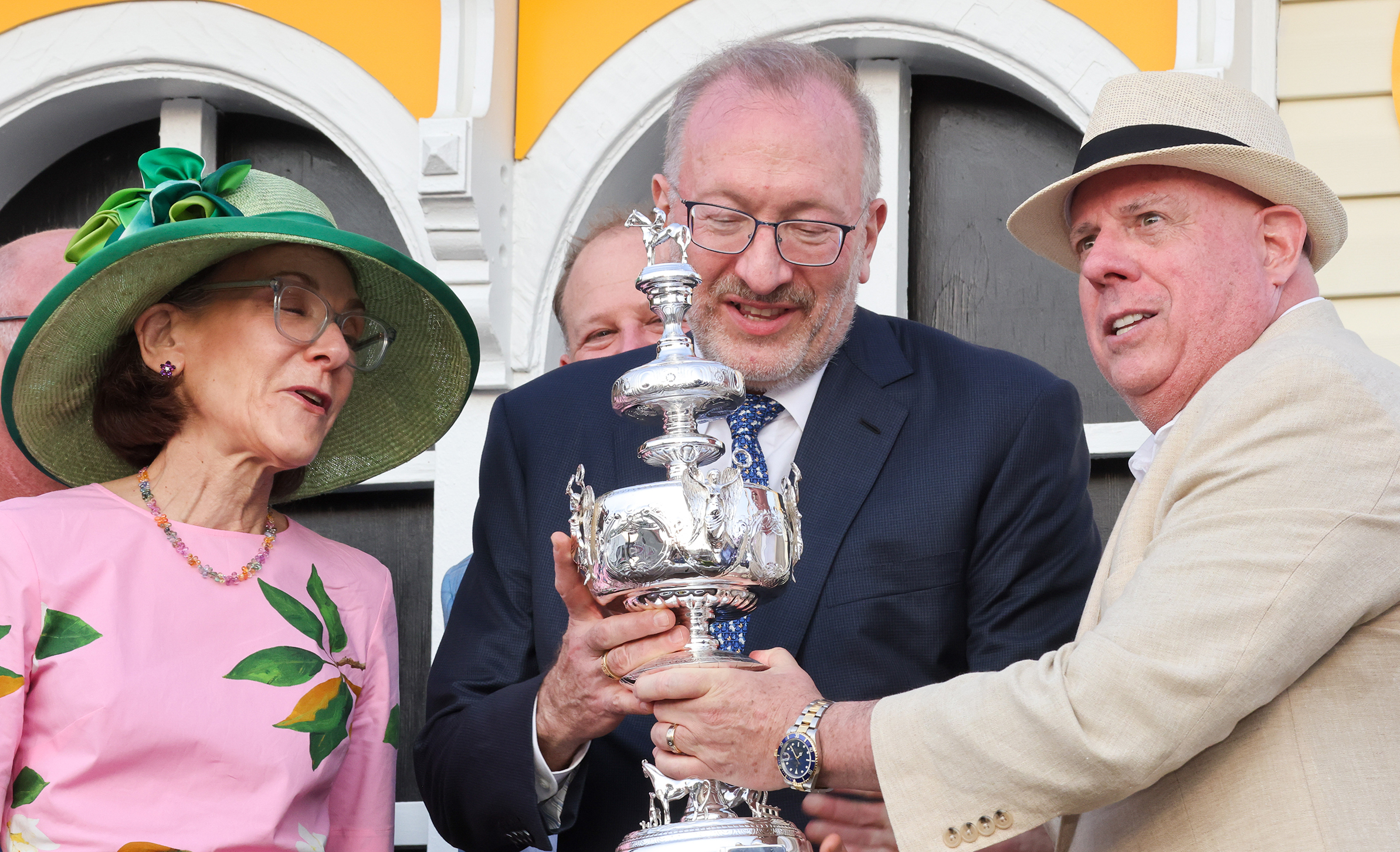
Beth and Seth Klarman with Maryland governor Larry Hogan in 2022

Historically, the Klarman Family Foundation has focused on grants for Jewish community organizations, medical research, and Harvard University, but speaking to The New York Times in 2018, Klarman stated that his foundation would make a larger effort to support "pro-democracy initiatives [and] organizations that protect journalists, combat bigotry and defend LGBT rights." Though Klarman himself was previously a megadonor for Republicans in New England, the foundation donated over $6 million to the New Venture Fund (NVF), a "dark money" network associated with the Democratic Party, in 2018. By 2025, the foundation had given more than $50 million to the NVF, nearly all of which went towards election-related initiatives, including $33.7 million to the Voter Engagement Fund, which focuses on boosting voter registration, and $500,000 to the Fair Representation in Redistricting Initiative, an NVF activist coalition seeking to redistrict electoral boundaries to favor the Democratic Party.

In 2019, the foundation gave $400,000 to the German Marshall Fund, which promotes closer U.S. ties to the European Union; $300,000 to the Project on Government Oversight, a D.C.-based government watchdog group; $250,000 to The Washington Institute for Near East Policy, a foreign policy think tank; and $100,000 to the public policy think tank Brookings Institution.

In 2022, the Klarman Family Foundation donated $25 million—alongside matching donations from The Peter G. Peterson Foundation, the Hewlett Foundation, and The Pew Charitable Trusts—to create the Election Trust Initiative, which seeks to "[strengthen] the field of election administration." The foundation gave almost $2.5 million to two Mark Zuckerberg-founded groups that funded election administration improvements during the 2020 elections. The Klarman Family Foundation also donated $3 million to Protect Democracy, a nonprofit organization founded by former members of the Obama administration.
