= Leslie Dach =

American businessman

Leslie Dach is an American businessman and former government executive. He has served in advisory roles for the Rockefeller Foundation and Skoll Foundation.

== Early life and education ==
Leslie Dach attended Yale University where he was roommates with Christopher Buckley.

== Career ==
Dach became involved in the Democratic Party during the 1988 United States presidential election and served as an aide in the administration of Bill Clinton. He later went to work for Edelman, a corporate public relations consultancy. In 2006 Dach accepted the position of Executive Vice-President of Governmental Relations and Corporate Affairs at Wal-Mart with a compensation package reported to be worth $3 million in stock options, on top of his annual salary. During the administration of Barack Obama he served as a senior counselor at the Department of Health and Human Services for almost two years. There, he worked on promotion of Obamacare.

The month following his departure from government, Dach was appointed to the board of directors of Sunrun.
