= Democracy Docket =

Media outlet covering American elections

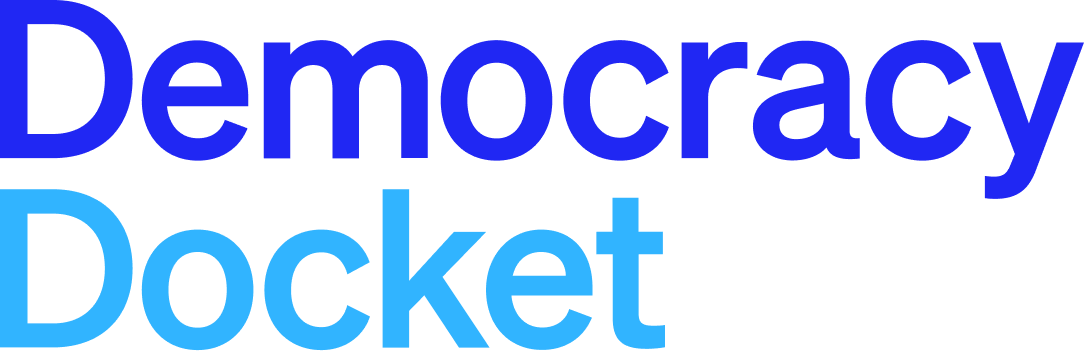
- Founded: March 5, 2020
- Founder: Marc Elias
- Website: Official website

Democracy Docket is a voting rights and media platform that tracks election litigation. It has been described as liberal-leaning and progressive.

It was founded in 2020 by Democratic Party lawyer Marc Elias and is published by Democracy Docket, LLC.

== History ==
Elias launched Democracy Docket on March 5, 2020, with the stated goal of educating the public on voting rights and redistricting litigation. In explaining why he founded the platform, Elias shared that "for years people would always ask me about the courts and democracy, but there was never one place for me to point them to specifically for reliable and up-to-date information about what's happening with voting, elections, and democracy in the courts. Of course, 2020 turned out to be a good year to start a pro-democracy news outlet, since the courts were so central, particularly in the post-election period, in preserving our democracy."

Elias was concerned that the Republican Party would have a newfound freedom in its efforts, as a court order prohibiting the party from past voter suppression tactics had expired. Writing that, in one Republican leader's words, the Republican Party planned to sue Democrats "into oblivion and spend whatever is necessary", Elias envisioned Democracy Docket as a platform to raise awareness and support efforts to defend election rules and results from Republican lawsuits in what was anticipated to be a close presidential election. As of June 2024, Democracy Docket claimed more than 175,000 newsletter subscribers. Its podcast Defending Democracy has featured guests such as Hillary Clinton and Eric Holder, and recorded 2.3 million views.

== Activities ==
Democracy Docket has advocated for making absentee voting more accessible, arguing that postage for mail-in ballots must be free or prepaid by the government, that ballots postmarked on or before election day must count, that signature matching laws should be reformed, and that community organizations should be permitted to help collect and deliver voted, sealed ballots.

Democracy Docket has written on legal efforts to restrict voting rights. This includes removal of ballot drop box lawsuits initiated by former Trump administration staff and advisors. Ballot drop boxes were popularized due to the 2019 global coronavirus pandemic and the associated minimizing of in-person polling place voting. Democracy Docket has also reported about the numerous redistricting congressional district lawsuits filed in several states prior to the 2024 elections.

== See also ==
- Courier Newsroom
- Democratic backsliding in the United States
- MeidasTouch
- More Perfect Union
- The Lever
