= Donorbox =

American fundraising software company

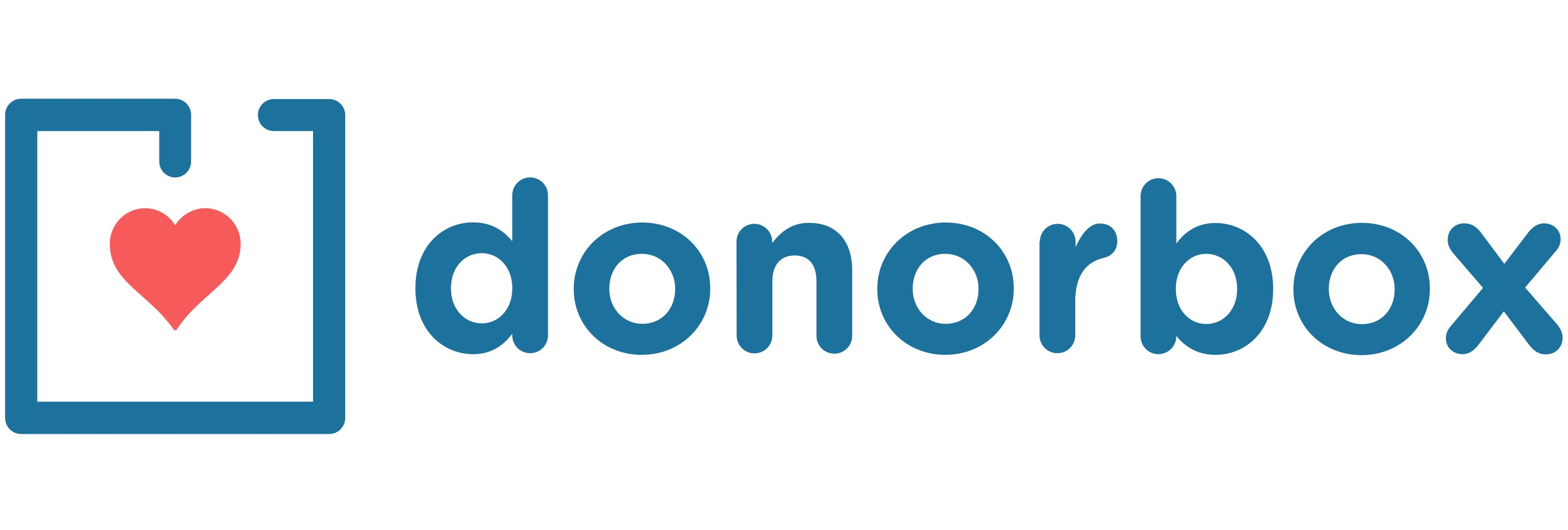

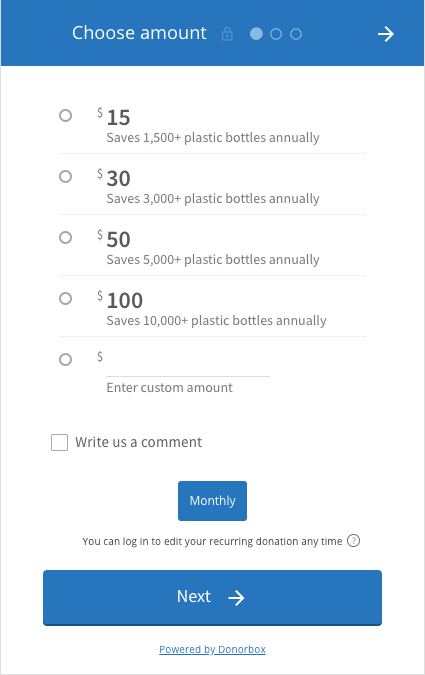
- Screenshot A screenshot of a 2018 fundraiser
- Website type: Online fundraising
- Headquarters: Alexandria, Virginia, {{{location_country}}}
- Founder: Charles Zhang
- Website: donorbox.org
- Commercial: Yes
- Launched: 2014

Donorbox is an American fundraising software company founded by Charles Zhang in 2014 and currently headquartered in Alexandria, Virginia. It provides tools through which individuals and nonprofit organizations can accept online donations. The platform also supports in-person cashless giving through self-service kiosks.

== History ==
Donorbox was established by Charles Zhang in 2014, initially launching as a free WordPress plug-in incorporating PayPal and Stripe functionality.

Donorbox states that its forms use SSL/TLS encryption and that the platform maintains PCI DSS Level 1 compliance. The company also reports completing SOC 2 Type I and Type II audits. Donorbox also operates a vulnerability disclosure program through the cybersecurity platform Intigriti.

By May 2018, Donorbox supported donations through Apple Pay, alongside credit cards, bank transfers, and PayPal.

In January 2022, NonProfit PRO reported Donorbox’s announcement that transactions conducted through the platform had reached $1 billion.

Donorbox received the Tech for Good award at the 2025 Global Digital Revolution Awards. In December of that year, the company joined the Fundraising Effectiveness Project as a fundraising-data provider.

In June 2026, Kiosk Marketplace reported Donorbox’s announcement that more than 100,000 organizations in 96 countries used the platform and that those organizations had raised more than $4 billion through it.

In August 2026, Donorbox was listed at No. 2,950 on the 2026 Inc. 5000, with 105% three-year revenue growth; local coverage identified it as one of five Alexandria-area companies newly appearing on that year’s list.

== Platform ==
=== Online fundraising ===
Donorbox provides hosted and embeddable donation forms, recurring-donation functions, crowdfunding tools, event ticketing, and donor-management software. A 2026 G2 guide described its CRM functions as supporting donor histories, reporting, recurring giving, and online fundraising workflows.

=== In-person fundraising ===
Donorbox also offers a tablet-based kiosk system that allows organizations to accept cashless donations at physical locations and events. The company deploys the kiosk system for use in churches, museums, schools, shelters, and at fundraising events.

== Reception ==
Donorbox has been discussed in published fundraising guides. Freedom of the Press described the platform as a simple way to process and manage online donations, while Beverly Browning’s Fundraising for Dummies recommended it to newer organizations seeking to accept donations.

== Content moderation ==
In 2017, Fast Company reported that Radix Journal, which was operated by the white-nationalist National Policy Institute, had used Donorbox before changing providers. Zhang told the publication that he opposed the organizations’ views but had continued providing service because he did not consider them to have met the platform’s threshold for removal.

In December 2018, BuzzFeed News reported that Donorbox suspended a fundraising account associated with far-right activist Tommy Robinson after he used it to raise money for a teenager accused of assaulting a Syrian refugee. By April 2019, the publication reported that Robinson was again using the platform. BuzzFeed News also reported that Donorbox had removed language prohibiting hate and intolerance from its terms during this period. Donorbox later amended its terms to prohibit the promotion of unlawful violence based on race, religion, gender, sexual orientation, national origin, disability, and other protected characteristics.

British far-right activist James Goddard used Donorbox after Facebook and PayPal suspended his accounts. In 2017, Zhang told Fast Company that Donorbox had removed accounts it considered to involve harassment or threats, including the Realist Report.

In 2020, The Guardian reported on a Center for Media and Democracy investigation that found three organizations designated as hate groups by the Southern Poverty Law Center still using Donorbox. Donorbox removed the Council of Conservative Citizens after being contacted by the investigators. The report also stated that some organizations had circumvented earlier restrictions by using alternate names and email addresses.

== See also ==
- Comparison of crowdfunding services
- Crowdfunding
- Crowdsourcing
