= Dark money =

Undisclosed American political contributions

In politics, particularly the politics of the United States, dark money refers to spending to influence elections, public policy, and political discourse, where the source of the money is not disclosed to the public.

In the United States, some types of nonprofit organizations may spend money on campaigns without disclosing who their donors are. The most common type of dark money group is the 501(c)(4) (often called social welfare organizations). Such organizations can receive unlimited donations from corporations, individuals and unions. Proponents of dark money maintain it is protected under the First Amendment, while critics complain recipients of dark money (as with any contribution) are beholden to their funders, while voters are kept in the dark about connections between donor and politician when favors are paid back.

Dark money entered the politics of the United States with Buckley v. Valeo (1976), when the United States Supreme Court laid out "Eight Magic Words" that define the difference between electioneering and issue advocacy – exempting the latter from election finance laws. Dark campaign spending increased from less than $5.2 million in 2006 to well over $300 million in the 2012 presidential cycle, more than $174 million in the 2014 midterms, $216 million in the 2014 midterm elections, and more than $1 billion in all 2020 federal elections. The 2010 landmark case, Citizens United v. FEC, marked the turning point when dark money contributions surged, and some political groups began contending that they were not required to register with the FEC as any sort of PAC because their primary purpose was something other than electoral politics. As of 2022, the non-profit OpenSecrets states that Dark money is "pouring" into U.S. elections, but not only are its donors not being disclosed, the total quantity of the dark money isn't either. "The vast majority" of what is spent "is not being disclosed to the Federal Election Commission".

In the 2020 election cycle, there were more than $1 billion in undisclosed spending; of that money, $514 million was spent to help Democrats and $200 million was spent to help Republicans. A New York Times analysis found that after a decade spent attacking undisclosed political spending on the right, the Democratic Party "embraced dark money with fresh zeal," spending over $1.5 billion in undisclosed cash in the 2020 election cycle and outspending the Republican Party.

== Etymology ==
The term was first used by the Sunlight Foundation to describe undisclosed funds that were used during the United States 2010 mid-term election. An example of the usage of the term "dark money" can be seen in a letter of resignation to President Donald Trump by former Federal Election Commissioner (FEC), Ann Ravel: "Since 2010, well over $800 million in dark money has been spent in competitive races. At the same time, elections have become more and more expensive. Most of the funding comes from a tiny, highly unrepresentative part of the population."

== Activities and influence ==
The rise of dark money groups was aided by the U.S. Supreme Court decisions in FEC v. Wisconsin Right to Life, Inc. (2008) and Citizens United v. FEC (2010). In Citizens United, the Court ruled (by a 5–4 vote) that corporations and unions could spend unlimited amounts of money to advocate for or against political candidates.

In some elections, dark money groups have surpassed traditional political action committees (PAC) and "super PACs" (independent-expenditure-only committees) in the volume of spending. In 2012, Freedom Partners had the ninth-highest revenues among all U.S. trade associations that filed tax returns that year, more than "established heavyweights" such as the American Petroleum Institute, PhRMA, and the U.S. Chamber of Commerce. Freedom Partners largely acted as a conduit for campaign spending; of the $238 million it spent in 2012, 99 percent went to other groups, and Freedom Partners itself did not have any employees. This was a major distinction between other high-revenue trade associations, which typically have many employees and devote only about 6 percent of spending to grants to outside groups. In 2014, Freedom Partners was identified as the "poster child" for the rise of dark money. The largest and most complex network of dark money groups are funded by billionaire business magnates Charles and David Koch; the Koch brothers' network accounted for about a quarter of dark money spending in 2012.

Approaching the 2018 midterm elections, in mid-September, just 15 groups accounted for three-quarters of the anonymous cash.

=== 2010 election cycle ===
According to OpenSecrets, dark money (which it defined as funds from outside groups that did not publicly disclose donors or those they substantially funded) accounted for nearly 44% of outside spending in the 2010 election cycle. It was estimated that dark money accounted for around $127 million for this cycle.

=== 2012 election cycle ===
In the 2012 election cycle, more than $308 million in dark money was spent, according to OpenSecrets. An estimated 86 percent was spent by conservative groups, 11 percent by liberal groups and 3 percent by other groups.

The three dark money groups which spent the largest sums were Karl Rove's American Crossroads/Crossroads GPS ($71 million), the Koch brothers' Americans for Prosperity ($36 million) and the U.S. Chamber of Commerce ($35 million), all conservative groups. The three liberal groups with the largest dark-money expenditures were the League of Conservation Voters ($11 million), Patriot Majority USA, a group focusing on public schools and infrastructure ($7 million), and Planned Parenthood (almost $7 million).

=== 2014 election cycle ===
The 2014 election cycle saw the largest amount of dark money ever spent in a congressional election; The New York Times editorial board described 2014 "the greatest wave of secret, special-interest money ever." On the eve of the election, Republican-leaning dark money groups dominated, with $94.6 million in expenditures, exceeding dark money expenditures by Democratic-leaning dark money groups ($28.4 million), and by expenditures that could not be classified ($1.9 million). Karl Rove's dark money group Crossroads GPS alone spent over $47 million in the 2014 election cycle.

In the Senate elections, dark money spending was highly concentrated in a handful of targeted competitive states, and especially in Alaska, Arkansas, Colorado, Kentucky, and North Carolina. In the eleven most competitive Senate races, $342 million was spent by non-party outside groups, significantly more than the $89 million spent by the political parties.

In the 2014 Kentucky election, a key player was the "Kentucky Opportunity Coalition", a group supporting Mitch McConnell, Republican of Kentucky, whom The New York Times editorial board has described as "the most prominent advocate for unlimited secret campaign spending in Washington." The Kentucky Opportunity Coalition, a 501(c)(4) "social welfare" group, raised more than $21 million, while McConnell raised about $32 million and McConnell's opponent, Democratic candidate Alison Lundergan Grimes, raised about $19 million. According to a Center for Public Integrity analysis of data provided by advertising tracking firm Kantar Media/CMAG, the group ran more than 12,400 television advertisements. Every Kentucky Opportunity Coalition's television advertisements mentioned either McConnell or Grimes; overall, about 53 percent of the group's ads praised McConnell while the rest were attack ads against Grimes. The Kentucky Opportunity Coalition relied heavily on political consultants in Washington, D.C., and Virginia linked to Karl Rove's Crossroads groups, and received $390,000 in a grant from Crossroads GPS. Described as "mysterious", the group was listed by a Post Office box, and the only name formally associated with the group was political operative J. Scott Jennings, a deputy political director in the George W. Bush administration, a worker for McConnell's previous campaigns. Melanie Sloan of the watchdog organization Citizens for Responsibility and Ethics in Washington said that the Kentucky Opportunity Coalition was "nothing more than a sham".

Dark money also played a role in other competitive Senate seats in 2014. In ten competitive Senate seats, the winners had the following in dark-money support, according to an analysis by the Brennan Center for Justice at New York University School of Law:

Winning candidate	Dark Money in Support	Dark Money as % of Nonparty Outside Spending in Support
Thom Tillis (R-NC)	$22,888,975	81%
Cory Gardner (R-CO)	$22,529,291	89%
Joni Ernst (R-IA)	$17,552,085	74%
Mitch McConnell (R-KY)	$13,920,163	63%
Tom Cotton (R-AR)	$12,502,284	65%
David Perdue (R-GA)	$11,098,585	86%
Dan Sullivan (R-AK)	$10,823,196	85%
Pat Roberts (R-KS)	$8,454,938	78%
Gary Peters (D-MI)	$4,226,674	28%
Jeanne Shaheen (D-NH)	$3,478,039	35%
Total	$127,475,231	71%

In North Carolina, the pro-Tillis group "Carolina Rising" received nearly all (98.7%) of its funds from Crossroads GPS; OpenSecrets highlighted this as an example of how Crossroads GPS, a 501(c)(4) group, "evades limits on political activity through grants" to other 501(c)(4) groups. In the 2014 cycle, Crossroads GPS also gave $5.25 million to the U.S. Chamber of Commerce, $2 million to the American Future Fund, and $390,000 to the Kentucky Opportunity Coalition. In total, Crossroads GPS spent more than $13.6 million on grants to other groups, which it described as being for the purposes of "social welfare".

In 2014, the Democratic Party-aligned dark money group Patriot Majority USA, a 501(c)(4), spent almost $13.7 million on "direct and indirect political campaign activities", airing 15,000 television ads in targeted Senate races. About half of the $30 million raised by the group came from five anonymous donors. The group was led by Craig Varoga, "a staunch ally" of Senate Minority Leader Harry Reid, Democrat of Nevada.

In Alaska, Mark Begich was "one of the few Democratic candidates to come close to receiving as much support from dark money as his Republican opponent." The pro-Begich Alaska Salmon PAC, funded entirely by the League of Conservation Voters and its Alaska affiliate, spent funds in support of Begich.

=== 2016 election cycle ===
According to OpenSecrets, by October 2015, $4.88 million in dark money had already been spent for the 2016 election cycle, "more than 10 times the $440,000 that was spent at this point during the 2012 cycle." The money was spent by six groups – five conservative groups (including the U.S. Chamber of Commerce, which spent $3 million, and Americans for Prosperity, which spent $1.5 million) and one liberal group (Planned Parenthood, which spent just under $75,000).

According to Richard Skinner of the Sunlight Foundation, "the focus of early dark money being spent in the 2016 cycle" is on competitive U.S. Senate elections and some U.S. House of Representatives races. However, dark money also is playing a role in the 2016 Republican presidential primaries; by June 2015, at least four Republican presidential candidates were raising funds via 501(c)(4) organizations: Bobby Jindal's America Next, Rick Perry's Americans for Economic Freedom, John Kasich's Balanced Budget Forever, and Jeb Bush's Right to Rise.

=== 2018 election cycle ===
In September 2018, the Supreme Court ruled against a 40-year FEC dark money loophole, requiring "independent expenditure" groups disclose donations over a certain amount. Reports revealed that during the 2018 midterm elections, dark money spending by liberal groups accounted for about 54 percent during the election cycle, outpacing conservative and nonpartisan groups spending, which claimed 31 percent and 15 percent, respectively.

=== 2020 election cycle ===
In the 2020 election cycle, there was more than $1 billion in undisclosed spending; of that money, $514 million was spent to help Democrats and $200 million was spent to help Republicans. Joe Biden received $174 million in anonymous contributions, over six times as much as Donald Trump's $25 million. According to The American Prospect, Democrats "claim to agree that money in politics can be detrimental to democracy, but they cannot afford to let all the benefits of super PAC spending flow to Republicans...more quietly, leaders in the progressive fundraising world will admit that transparency is just not a serious priority anymore."

The Sixteen Thirty Fund, an affiliate of liberal donor advised fund Arabella Advisors, spent $410 million in 2020 (more than the Democratic National Committee itself), largely focused on helping Democrats defeat President Donald Trump and winning back control of the United States Senate. The group financed attack ads against Trump and vulnerable Republican senators and funded various issue advocacy campaigns. Funding went to groups opposing Trump's Supreme Court nominees, supporting liberal ballot measures and policy proposals at the state level, and opposing Republican tax and health care policies. The Sixteen Thirty Fund raised $390 million in 2020, with half of that amount coming from just four donors. The Atlantic called the Sixteen Thirty Fund "the indisputable heavyweight of Democratic dark money," noting that it was the second-largest super-PAC donor in 2020, donating $61 million of "effectively untraceable money to progressive causes."

Because of the way they are legally structured, Arabella Advisors and its affiliates are not required to disclose their donors, and they have not opted to do so. Politico has described Arabella as a "left-leaning, secret-money group," writing that the group "illustrates the extent to which the left embraced the use of 'dark money' to fight for its causes in recent years. After decrying big-money Republican donors over the last decade, as well as the Supreme Court rulings that flooded politics with more cash, Democrats now benefit from hundreds of millions of dollars of undisclosed donations as well."

A New York Times analysis of undisclosed spending in the 2020 election found that 15 of the most politically active Democratic-aligned organizations spent more than $1.5 billion in 2020, while 15 comparable groups aligned with the Republican Party spent $900 million. According to the New York Times, "The findings reveal the growth and ascendancy of a shadow political infrastructure that is reshaping American politics, as megadonors to these nonprofits take advantage of loose disclosure laws to make multimillion-dollar outlays in total secrecy." The authors noted the tension between the Democratic Party's desire to win elections and their stated "commitment to curtail secretive political spending by the superrich."

=== 2022 election cycle ===
In 2021, Barre Seid donated stock worth $1.6 billion to Marble Freedom Trust, a 501(c)(4) conservative political group led by Leonard Leo, a former adviser to Donald Trump. The donation was made anonymously, but Seid's identity was first confirmed by The New York Times based on public financial disclosures. The New York Times described the donation as "among the largest single contributions ever to a politically focused nonprofit."

Leading up to the 2022 midterm elections, Senate Democrats introduced the DISCLOSE Act, which would require organizations that spend more than $10,000 on election donations to disclose the identity of those donors. The Senate failed to advance the Disclose Act on a 49-49 party line vote, with no Republicans voting to advance it.

== State nonprofit donor disclosure prohibitions ==
Arizona became the first state to prohibit cooperation in the disclosure of nonprofit donors identities, shielding PACs and campaigns from federal election laws. Mississippi adopted a similar donor disclosure ban in 2019; Utah, Oklahoma, and Virginia enacted them in 2020; as did Arkansas, Iowa, South Dakota, and Tennessee in 2021.

== Comparison to (and relationship with) super PACs ==
Dark money (501(c)) groups and super PACs compared (source: Sunlight Foundation)
	Super PACs	Dark-money groups
Type of entity	Campaign committee (regulated by FEC)	Nonprofit (regulated by IRS)
Disclosure of contributors required?	Yes	No except for independent expenditure groups over a certain amount
Disclosure of expenditures required?	Yes through filings with FEC and sometimes tax filings with IRS (Tax filings are typically delayed by year or more; often submitted long after elections have ended)	Yes only through tax filings with IRS (Form 990s) (Typically delayed by year or more; often submitted long after elections have ended)
Limits on dollar amount of contributions?	None	None
Can be wholly political?	Yes	No (political activity cannot be majority of expenditures but can make up to 49.9 percent of expenditures)
Coordination with candidates?	Impermissible	Impermissible

501(c) "dark money" groups are distinct from super PACs. While both types of entity can raise and spend unlimited sums of money, super PACs "must disclose their donors", while 501(c) groups "must not have politics as their primary purpose but don't have to disclose who gives them money." However, a single individual or group can create both types of entity and combine their powers, making it difficult to trace the original source of funds. ProPublica explains: "Say some like-minded people form both a Super-PAC and a nonprofit 501(c)(4). Corporations and individuals could then donate as much as they want to the nonprofit, which isn't required to publicly disclose funders. The nonprofit could then donate as much as it wanted to the Super-PAC, which lists the nonprofit's donation but not the original contributors." In at least one high-profile case, a donor to a super PAC kept his name hidden by using an LLC formed for the purpose of hiding their personal name. One super PAC, that originally listed a $250,000 donation from an LLC that no one could find, led to a subsequent filing where the previously "secret donors" were revealed.

During the 2016 election cycle, "dark money" contributions via shell LLCs became increasingly common. The Associated Press, Center for Public Integrity, and Sunlight Foundation all "flagged dozens of donations of anywhere from $50,000 to $1 million routed through non-disclosing LLCs to super PACs" backing various presidential candidates, including Marco Rubio, Hillary Clinton, Ted Cruz, John Kasich, Jeb Bush, and Carly Fiorina.

Bradley A. Smith, a former FEC chairman who founded the Center for Competitive Politics, a group that opposes campaign-finance reform, argued in 2011 that this practice is not problematic, writing that "it is possibly the making of a campaign contribution in the name of another," a violation of existing law.

According to Kathy Kiely, managing editor of the Sunlight Foundation, "untraceable dark money is a preferred tactic of conservatives, while Democrats tend to use traceable super PACs."

== Disclosure in U.S. elections ==
The first federal law requiring disclosure of campaign contributions, the Federal Corrupt Practices Act, was passed in 1910. By the late 1970s, virtually all states and the federal government required public disclosure of campaign contributions and information on political donors. Most states and the federal government also required public disclosure of information about donors and amounts spent on independent expenditures, that is, expenditures made independently of a candidate's campaign.

In January 2010, at least 38 states and the federal government required disclosure for all or some independent expenditures or electioneering communications, for all sponsors.

Yet despite disclosure rules, it is possible to spend money without voters knowing the identities of donors before the election. In federal elections, for example, political action committees have the option to choose to file reports on a "monthly" or "quarterly" basis. This allows funds raised by PACs in the final days of the election to be spent and votes cast before the report is due.

In addition to PACs, non-profit groups ranging from Planned Parenthood to Crossroads GPS may make expenditures in connection with political races. Since these non-profits are not political committees, as defined in the Federal Election Campaign Act, they had few reporting requirements beyond the amounts of their expenditures, and until 2018 were not required to publicly disclose information on their donors. As a result, voters did not know who gave money to these groups. Reports have disclosed instances where non-profits were managed by close associates, former staff, or a candidate's family member, which has led to concern that the candidates benefiting from their expenditures would be able to know who donated the funds to the non-profit group, but the public would not.

For example, in the 2012 election cycle, one organization, the National Organization for Marriage (NOM) operated two non-profit arms that received millions in donations from just a few donors. It in turn funded several different PACs. While these PACs had to disclose that NOM contributed the funds, they were not required to disclose who gave this money to NOM in the first place.

On March 30, 2012, a U.S. District Court ruled that all groups that spend money on electioneering communications must report all donors that give more than $1,000. However, this ruling was overturned on appeal. In 2018 the U.S. District Court for D.C. struck down the Federal Election Commission's regulation allowing these groups to conceal their donors if they were engaged in political activity. The Supreme Court later declined to review this decision.

== Legislative and regulatory proposals and debate ==
Democrats in the United States Congress have repeatedly introduced the DISCLOSE Act, proposed legislation to require disclosure of election spending by "corporations, labor unions, super-PACs, and, most importantly, politically active nonprofits." The 2014 version of the DISCLOSE Act would require covered groups, including 501(c)(4), to reveal the source of election-spending donations of $10,000 or more. The bill also targets the use of pass-through and shell corporations to evade disclosure by requiring that such groups disclose the origin of contributions. Senate Republicans, led by their leader Mitch McConnell, "have blocked earlier iterations of the DISCLOSE Act since 2010."

According to legal scholar Richard Briffault, disclosure of campaign expenditures, contributions, and donors is intended to deter corruption.

The Federal Election Commission (FEC), which regulates federal elections, has been unable to control dark money. According to the Center for Public Integrity, FEC commissioners are voting on many fewer enforcement matters than in the past because of "an overtaxed staff and commissioner disagreement." The IRS (rather than the FEC) is responsible for oversight of 501(c)(4) groups. The IRS "found itself ill-prepared for the groundswell" of such groups taking and spending unlimited amounts of money for political purposes in the wake of the U.S. Supreme Court's decision in Citizens United v. Federal Election Commission in 2010. The agency particularly "struggled to identify which organizations appeared to be spending more than the recommended 50 percent of their annual budgets on political activities—and even to define what 'political spending' was." When the IRS began looking at nonprofit spending, it was accused of improper targeting in a 2013 controversy.

"With the FEC and IRS duly sidelined," advocates for disclosure turned to the Securities and Exchange Commission (SEC); nine academics from universities across the U.S. petitioned the SEC in August 2011 for the agency to "develop rules to require public companies to disclose to shareholders the use of corporate resources for political activities." The petition received over a million comments in the following month, "a record amount for the SEC, with the overwhelming majority of voters asking for better disclosure." According to Lucian Bebchuk, a Harvard professor of law, economics, and finance who helped draft the petition, the request had drawn the support of "nearly a dozen senators and more than 40 members of the House." Under current SEC regulations, public corporations must file a Form 8-K report to publicly announce major events of interest to shareholders. The Sunlight Foundation, a group which advocates for a comprehensive disclosure regime, has proposed that the 8-K rule should be updated to require that aggregate spending of $10,000 on political activities (such as monetary contributions, in-kind contributions, and membership dues or other payments to organizations that engage in political activities) should be disclosed and made publicly available via the 8-K system.

In 2015, Republicans in Congress successfully pushed for a rider in a 2015 omnibus spending bill that bars the IRS from clarifying the social-welfare tax exemption to combat dark money "from advocacy groups that claim to be social welfare organizations rather than political committees." Other provisions in the 2015 bill bar the SEC from requiring corporations to disclose campaign spending to shareholders, and a ban application of the gift tax to nonprofit donors. The Obama administration opposed these provisions, but President Obama eventually acceded to them in December 2015, with the White House declining to comment. The nonpartisan Campaign Legal Center said in a statement that the dark-money provision ensures "that the door to secret foreign dollars in U.S. elections remains wide open through secret contributions to these ostensibly 'nonpolitical' groups that run campaign ads without any disclosure of their donors."

The Center for Competitive Politics (CCP), chaired by former FEC chairman Bradley A. Smith, opposes legislation to require the disclosure of dark-money groups, saying: "Our view is that many people will be driven out of politics if they are forced to disclose their names and their personal information. The purpose of disclosure is to help people monitor the government, not for the government to monitor the people." The Center for Competitive Politics views "dark money" as a pejorative term, stating that the phrase "evokes an emotional, fearful reaction" and contending that "many of the statistics published on the topic aim to mislead rather than enlighten." The CCP maintains that dark money "comprises a very small percentage of total campaign spending," calculating the percent of money spent in federal elections by organizations that did not provide itemized disclosure of their donors as 4.3% in 2012 and 3.7% in 2014.

In May 2019 the Attorney General of New York, Letitia James, filed a lawsuit against the Treasury Department and the IRS for failing to respond to information requests about their guidance reducing donor disclosure requirements for certain tax-exempt groups.

== Campaign advertising ==
501(c)(4) nonprofits are able to spend money on campaign advertising without having to disclose donor information. A 2017 review article in Business and Politics found that anonymous political expenditures are associated with negative ads. The article found that conservatives are more likely than liberals to purchase negative advertising with undisclosed funding, although conservatives and liberals are equally as likely to attack candidates. When negative ads are perceived as truthful, they increase positive outlook on the sponsor while producing unfavorable attitudes toward the candidate in the ad.

== Partisan news websites ==
A 2024 study by NewsGuard, a misinformation tracking company, found that "the number of partisan-backed outlets designed to look like impartial news outlets has officially surpassed the number of real, local daily newspapers in the U.S." NewsGuard identified at least 1,265 such websites "backed by dark money or intentionally masquerading as local news sites for political purposes." According to Axios, almost half of these websites are targeted to swing states, "a clear sign that they're designed to influence politics." Meanwhile, as of 2023, there were only 1,213 daily local newspapers in the U.S. On the conservative side, Metric Media is a major backer of partisan websites designed to look like news websites. On the left, Courier Newsroom and States Newsroom were described by Axios as "some of the more strategic sites."

== See also ==
- Shadow campaigns in the United States
- Dark Money (book)
- Independent expenditure
- Issue advocacy versus express advocacy
- Political action committee
- Regulatory capture
