= Fiscal sponsorship =

Use of a nonprofit's tax-exempt status by an unincorporated group

Fiscal sponsorship refers to the practice of non-profit organizations offering their legal and tax-exempt status to groups—typically projects—engaged in activities related to the sponsoring organization's mission. It typically involves a fee-based contractual arrangement between a project and an established non-profit. Originally, this concept was developed at the request of the Department of Housing and Urban Development to enable distribution of funds to local charitable groups in the 1950s and has been a practice ever since.

== Advantages of fiscal sponsorship ==
Fiscal sponsorship can enable projects to share a common administrative platform with a larger organization, thus increasing efficiency. In addition to legal status, sponsors can provide payroll, employee benefits, office space, publicity, fundraising assistance, and training services, sparing projects the necessity of developing these resources and allowing them to focus on programmatic activities.

Projects may seek fiscal sponsorship for various reasons: an anticipated short lifespan, improved access to funding, increased credibility, and low-cost financial and administrative services. Fiscal sponsors can also assist nascent projects in developing the necessary organizational capabilities to eventually spin off as independent non-profits.

== Risks ==
Fiscal sponsorship arrangements, if not handled carefully, can be vulnerable to the criticism that they serve merely as conduits for the transmission of tax-deductible donations to entities not qualified to receive them.

However, in the last decade, the phenomenon of fiscal sponsorship has become a common ancillary activity for public charities involved in human service, environmental, and artistic endeavors. Non-profit institutions solely devoted to fiscal sponsorship have sprung up across the country, ranging from documentary film sponsors to public health research groups to separate corporations spun off by community foundations.

Nevertheless, it is important for both sponsors and projects to understand the exact nature of their relationship.

- Sponsors are advised to ensure that the activity of sponsoring a particular project is done in furtherance of its own exempted charitable purposes, as sponsors can be exposed to some liability for the actions of any sponsored projects.
- Projects are advised to recognize that projects will be under the control of their sponsor(s), who may be legally responsible for the operations and activities of the project.

The benefits of immediate tax-exempt status and administrative support must be weighed against the lack of autonomy and fees typically charged by the sponsor.

== Models of fiscal sponsorship ==
Fiscal sponsorship is practiced with many different models, which offer different benefits.

=== Table comparing the models ===
	Basic characteristics	Is project a separate legal entity?	Relationship	Charitable donations belong to...	Liability of sponsor to 3rd parties	Ownership of result	Payments shown on IRS returns filed by Sponsor	Payments shown on IRS returns filed by Project	Comments
Direct project	Project belongs to sponsor and is implemented by its employees and volunteers.	No	Employer- Employee	Sponsor	Total liabilities for acts of employees.	Sponsor	990, payroll tax returns	Individual 1040's	Legally, the project is no different from any other activity carried on by the sponsor directly.
Independent contractor project	Project belongs to sponsor but is conducted by separate entity under contract.	Yes	Project- Contract	Sponsor	Varies, may be partial or total.	Sponsor usually	990, 1099 if person	Depends on legal status.	Appropriate where a project is an integral part of the sponsor's work, but may be legally performed by an independent contractor.
Pre-approved grant relationship	Project applies to sponsor for one or a series of grants, sponsor funds the project only to the extent that money is received from donors.	Yes	Grantor- Grantee	Sponsor	Selection and payment of grantee, plus terms set by funding source.	Project usually	990	Depends on legal status.	Used by a non-501(c)(3) project, in order to raise tax deductible support from donors, private foundation or government grants.
Group exemption	Sponsor obtains federal group tax exemption, confers 501(c)(3) status on subordinate projects.	Yes	Subordinate- Affiliate	Project	Only as provided in affiliation agreement.	Project	Annual listing of organizations, no financial information.	990, separate or group return	Project gets 501(c)(3) status without separate application to IRS; must be subject to general supervision or control of sponsor.
Supporting organization	Project gets its own 501(c)(3) exemption, but public charity status is based on support of sponsor's purposes.	Yes	Varies	Project	None	Project	None	990	Project must apply to IRS for 501(c)(3) status, but can be a public charity even with only one donor.
Technical assistance	Project has its own 501(c)(3) exemption but needs help with bookkeeping, tax returns, payroll, management, etc.	Yes	Management- Contract	Project	Only as provided in the contract.	Project	990, if fee charged	990, if fee paid	Sponsor provides financial management to project, but all funds are raised and spent in the name of the project
Wholly owned LLC	Project is incorporated as a limited-liability company and wholly owned by a sponsor 501(c)(3)	Yes	parent-subsidiary	Sponsor	limited liability	sponsor	Yes — financial activity of project is included on sponsor 990	LLC is "disregarded' and files no tax return of its own	Provides some limit to sponsor's liability despite owning the project. Easy to spin off or sell an "incubated" project.
