= Michael F. Cannon =

American economist and health policy scholar

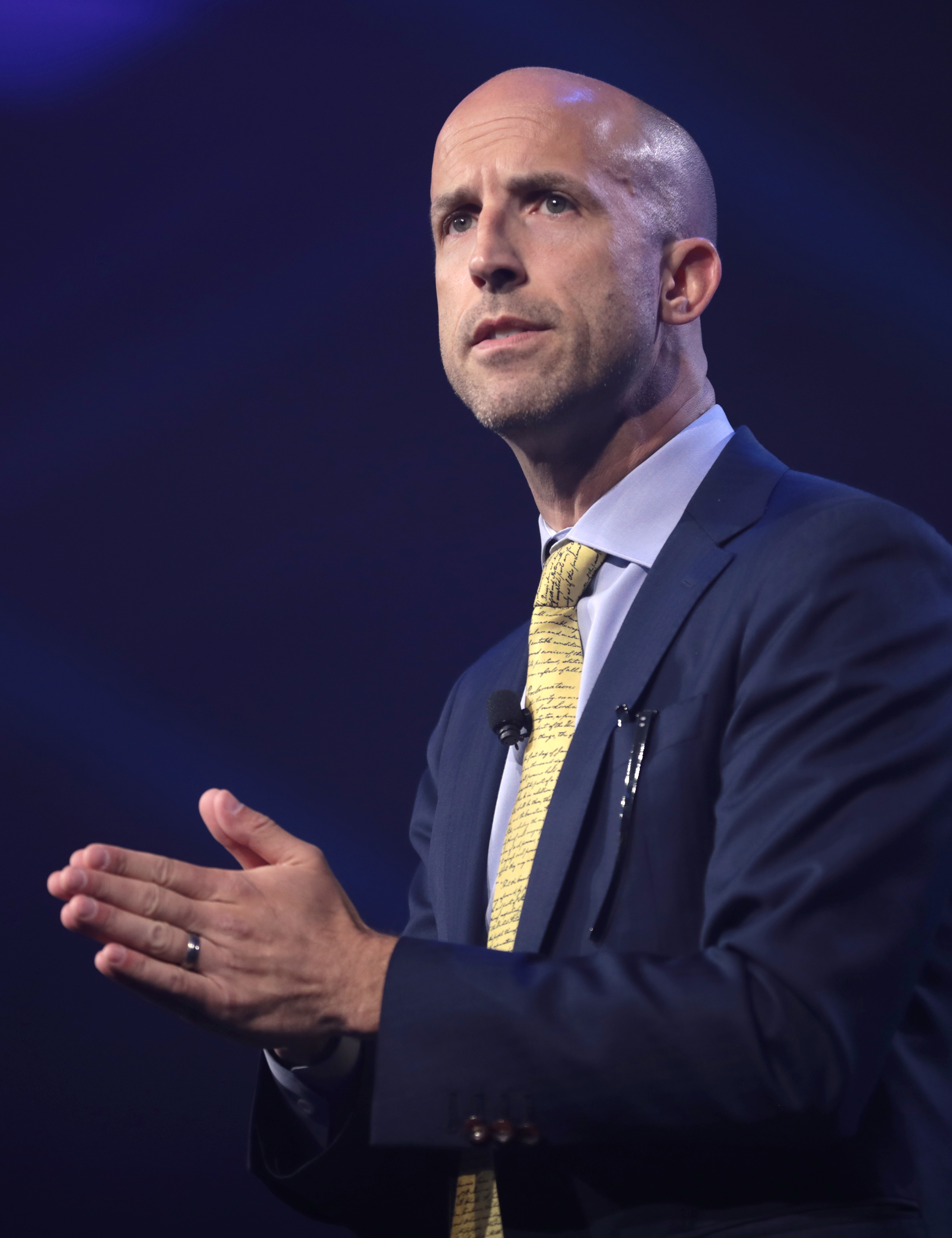
- Cannon in 2022
- Born: Jackson Heights, Queens, New York City, U.S.
- Citizenship: United States; Ireland
- Education: University of Virginia (BA); George Mason University (MA, JM)
- Occupations: Economist, health policy scholar
- Employer: Cato Institute
- Known for: Legal theory behind King v. Burwell and Halbig v. Burwell; opposition to the Affordable Care Act
- Notable work: Healthy Competition (2005; with Michael D. Tanner); Recovery: A Guide to Reforming the U.S. Health Sector (2023)
- Title: Director of Health Policy Studies
- Relatives: Eugene J. Butler (grandfather), Peter Cannon (grandfather), Frances Cannon (grandmother)
- Website: Cato Institute profile

Michael F. Cannon is an American economist and health policy scholar who directs health policy studies at the Cato Institute, a libertarian think tank in Washington, D.C. He gained his widest prominence as a critic of the Affordable Care Act (ACA) and as the co-author, with law professor Jonathan H. Adler, of the legal argument that the law did not authorize premium tax credits in states that use the federal Exchange, HealthCare.gov. That argument underlay Halbig v. Burwell and King v. Burwell; the Supreme Court rejected it 6–3 in 2015. Modern Healthcare called him "the intellectual father" of King v. Burwell.

Cannon's work also covers the tax treatment of employer-sponsored health insurance, Medicare, Medicaid, drug and clinician regulation, public health, and medical malpractice law. He wrote Recovery: A Guide to Reforming the U.S. Health Sector (2023) and co-wrote Healthy Competition (2005). Washingtonian has included him in its annual list of Washington's most influential people every year since 2021.

== Early life and education ==
Cannon's birthplace was Jackson Heights, Queens, in New York City. He attended P.S. 21 in Flushing, Queens. His paternal grandfather, Peter Cannon (1901–1970), emigrated from County Donegal, Ireland, sailing from Derry aboard the Anchor Line's SS Cameronia and reaching New York on October 3, 1926; he later became a naturalized U.S. citizen. His paternal grandmother, Frances Cannon, also emigrated from Ireland, arriving in 1927, and kept her Irish citizenship. Cannon holds both U.S. and Irish citizenship. His grandfather Eugene J. Butler directed the legal department of the National Catholic Welfare Conference, a predecessor of the United States Conference of Catholic Bishops; in October 1954, Pope Pius XII made Butler a Knight Commander of the Order of St. Gregory the Great.

As a teenager, Cannon delivered The Washington Post from about 1986 to 1990. He later told Washingtonian that the job taught him that "adults prefer to read their newspapers earlier than teenagers prefer to deliver them." He graduated from McLean High School in McLean, Virginia, in 1990, the year he finished as the school's top scorer on the American High School Mathematics Examination (AHSME). At the University of Virginia, he studied under Steven E. Rhoads, Larry J. Sabato and Julian Bond. He wrote for the Virginia Advocate and occasionally for the university's two daily student newspapers. UVA's College Republicans elected him president; he resigned soon after. He earned a Bachelor of Arts in American government from UVA in 1994.

Cannon has said that he began his political life on the left, hanging campaign materials around his neighborhood for Michael Dukakis in 1988, before studying economics led him to libertarianism. In 2007 he earned a Master of Arts in economics and a Juris Master in law and economics from George Mason University, the latter from the school George Mason now calls the Antonin Scalia Law School.

== Career ==
=== Early career ===
In 1994 Cannon served on the professional campaign staff of Kyle McSlarrow, the Republican candidate for Congress in Virginia's 8th congressional district. That year he joined Citizens for a Sound Economy, first as an administrative assistant to former Office of Management and Budget director James C. Miller III and, from 1996 to 1999, as a health care policy analyst. From 1999 to 2003 he worked as a domestic policy analyst for the Senate Republican Policy Committee, advising the Senate's Republican leadership on health, education, labor, welfare, and Second Amendment issues. In 2003 he directed government affairs for the National Center for Policy Analysis.

=== Cato Institute ===
Cannon joined the Cato Institute as director of health policy studies in 2004, the same year the Claremont Institute named him a Lincoln Fellow. At Cato he directs research on public and private health insurance, Medicare, Medicaid, the Children's Health Insurance Program, the Veterans Health Administration, the regulation of clinicians, drugs and medical devices, public health, and medical malpractice.

He has testified before committees of both houses of Congress, including the House Oversight Committee (2011, 2012), the House Judiciary Committee (2013), and the Senate Judiciary Committee (2015, 2021), and before legislative committees in states including Florida, Missouri, Nebraska, Ohio, Pennsylvania, Tennessee, Utah and Virginia. His writing has appeared in The Wall Street Journal, The New York Times, The Washington Post, USA Today, and the Los Angeles Times, and in journals including JAMA Internal Medicine, Health Affairs, and the Yale Journal of Health Policy, Law, and Ethics.

In 2012, when Charles and David Koch sued for control of Cato, Cannon published an open letter to them in Politico, writing it without his employer's knowledge. He argued that "even the perception that a think tank is dependent on a single financial interest is enough to wreck its credibility," and asked the brothers to help produce "a compromise that precludes any single financial interest from ever owning or having a controlling interest in the Cato Institute."

From 2013 to 2016 he also wrote "Darwin's Fool," a blog at Forbes.

Cannon serves on the board of advisers of the Harvard Health Policy Review and on the Health Executive Committee of the Federalist Society.

== Affordable Care Act ==
=== State Exchanges ===
Cannon opposed the ACA during its passage in 2009–2010 and continues to advocate its repeal. In 2009 he argued that Democrats had designed the law's mandates on private insurers and employers to keep their costs off the federal budget, making the law look less expensive than it was. Slate's Reihan Salam later cited the point, describing Cannon as "an indefatigable libertarian foe of Obamacare." In an August 2009 op-ed in the Detroit Free Press, Cannon called Sarah Palin's "death panel" label hyperbolic but argued that she was "partly right": the Independent Medicare Advisory Council that President Obama had proposed, he wrote, "would enable Medicare to overcome the political resistance to government rationing." He also wrote that Palin erred in attacking advance care planning.

After the law's enactment, Cannon urged state governments not to create their own health insurance Exchanges. He traveled to more than a dozen states and testified before their legislatures. In 2013 he and the Cato Institute published 50 Vetoes: How States Can Stop the Obama Health Care Law. Writing in The New Republic in November 2013, Alec MacGillis argued that Cannon had played an outsized role in persuading states such as New Hampshire to leave Exchange-building to the federal government, contributing to the troubled launch of HealthCare.gov. Cannon disputed the charge that his work amounted to sabotage. Health law professor Timothy Jost told MacGillis that observers overstated Cannon's influence and that the 2010 elections explained most states' decisions not to build Exchanges.

=== Pruitt, Halbig, Indiana, and King v. Burwell ===
Section 1401 of the ACA authorizes premium tax credits for coverage that consumers purchase "through an Exchange established by the State." Beginning in 2011, Cannon and Adler argued that this language made subsidies unavailable in states where the federal government operated the Exchange, and that an Internal Revenue Service rule extending subsidies to those states violated the law. They laid out the argument in testimony before the House Oversight Committee in 2011 and in a 2013 article in Health Matrix: Journal of Law-Medicine. Because the law's individual and employer mandate penalties depended in part on eligibility for the subsidies, they argued that the IRS rule also unlawfully exposed employers and individuals in those states to penalties.

They argued that Congress's willingness to withhold subsidies from uncooperative states had a precedent in the ACA's own drafting history. The bill that the Senate Health, Education, Labor and Pensions (HELP) Committee approved in 2009 conditioned Exchange subsidies on states implementing that bill's employer mandate. Adler and Cannon noted that in states that refused, residents would have faced "even more destabilizing community-rating price controls than the ACA imposes, but without any subsidies," a recipe for worse adverse selection than the outcome the government warned of in the litigation. Even so, "all 12 HELP Committee Democrats, a group that included several of the ACA's authors, voted in favor of that bill and that provision." They argued that this history supported the plain meaning of the enacted text.

The Hill listed Cannon among its "100 People to Watch This Fall" in 2013, noting that he had helped Oklahoma file suit against the subsidies (Pruitt v. Burwell) and that a ruling in his favor "could have a devastating impact" on the law. Cannon and Adler filed amicus briefs supporting the plaintiffs in Halbig v. Sebelius and King v. Sebelius in district court, and in Halbig v. Burwell and King v. Burwell on appeal.

Four lawsuits ultimately challenged the IRS rule: Pruitt v. Sebelius, in which Oklahoma Attorney General Scott Pruitt added the claim to an existing suit against the ACA in 2012; Halbig v. Sebelius, which employers and individuals filed in Washington, D.C., in May 2013; King v. Sebelius, filed in Virginia; and Indiana v. IRS. In August 2013, the federal court in Oklahoma denied the government's motion to dismiss Pruitt. Federal district courts in Washington, D.C., and Virginia ruled against the plaintiffs in Halbig and King in early 2014. On July 22, 2014, however, a three-judge panel of the D.C. Circuit ruled 2–1 for the Halbig plaintiffs and struck down the IRS rule. The same day, the Fourth Circuit ruled unanimously against the King plaintiffs. The D.C. Circuit later vacated its panel decision and agreed to rehear the case en banc.

On September 30, 2014, in Oklahoma ex rel. Pruitt v. Burwell, the Oklahoma case, U.S. District Judge Ronald A. White of the Eastern District of Oklahoma also struck down the IRS rule, holding that the agency had acted "in excess of statutory jurisdiction, authority, or limitations." White stayed his ruling pending appeal. The government appealed to the Tenth Circuit, and in November 2014 Oklahoma asked the Supreme Court to take up Pruitt before the appeals court ruled. The Supreme Court instead resolved the issue in King.

The Washington Post described Cannon as "arguably the most visible proponent" of the challenge and reported that many regarded him as its main intellectual force. Cannon acknowledged that a victory for the plaintiffs would raise premiums for millions of people, but argued that the harm stemmed from Obamacare itself and that Congress had never authorized the subsidies. Urban Institute economist Linda Blumberg called his reading of the statute "clearly false."

That same month, a 2012 video surfaced in which Obamacare consultant Jonathan Gruber said that residents of states that did not set up Exchanges would not receive tax credits. Cannon said Gruber's comments "totally disrupt the narrative that Congress could not have intended to do this." After the Supreme Court agreed to hear King in November 2014, Vox called Cannon "the man who could bring down Obamacare." On March 4, 2015, the day the Supreme Court heard oral argument in King, Cannon debated the case with Neera Tanden, president of the Center for American Progress, on PBS NewsHour. Cannon and Adler also published several articles defending the theory, including one in the Journal of Health Politics, Policy and Law.

On June 25, 2015, the Supreme Court ruled 6–3 that Obamacare authorized subsidies in all states. Writing for the majority, Chief Justice John Roberts held that, read in context, the phrase was ambiguous, and concluded that "Congress passed the Affordable Care Act to improve health insurance markets, not to destroy them." Justice Antonin Scalia dissented, and Justices Clarence Thomas and Samuel Alito joined him. Scalia adopted the reading Cannon and Adler had advanced: "Words no longer have meaning if an Exchange that is not established by a State is 'established by the State.'"

Cannon criticized the decision, arguing that the Court had ignored the statute's text and disenfranchised voters who had elected the law's opponents. In The Week, political scientist Scott Lemieux argued that Cannon's response amounted to an admission that the litigation had been a political project rather than a good-faith reading of the law. Adler and Cannon later published a critique of the ruling in the Cato Supreme Court Review.

=== Later positions ===
In March 2017 Cannon opposed the American Health Care Act, the House Republican bill to repeal and replace Obamacare, calling it "Obamacare lite or worse" and saying that "if this is the choice, it would be better if Congress simply did nothing." That year he advised the House Freedom Caucus, whose members opposed the bill. Representative Mark Meadows, the caucus's chairman, said on PBS NewsHour that "Mike Cannon is certainly a very learned individual when it comes to health care."

In 2019 Cannon opposed Texas v. United States, a lawsuit in which Republican-led states argued that all of Obamacare became unconstitutional once Congress reduced the individual mandate penalty to zero. Writing in the New York Post, he argued that District Judge Reed O'Connor had "followed the John Roberts playbook all the way down to the tortured reasoning" and that "two wrongs don't make a right."

== Other policy work ==
=== The "free-market" myth ===
Cannon disagrees with the common claim that the United States has a free-market health care system. In a 2025 National Affairs article, he wrote, citing OECD data, that government controls about 84 percent of U.S. health spending, a larger share than in 27 of 38 OECD countries, and that "among wealthy nations, the United States may have one of the least-free health-care markets." He argued that "U.S. health-care prices are excessive because government controls them."

=== Market concentration ===
Cannon argues that government policy, rather than market failure, drives much of the consolidation among hospitals, physician practices and insurers. In a 2022 Cato briefing paper, he wrote that "inefficient consolidation is a result of government failure, not market failure," citing certificate of need laws, regulations with high fixed costs, tax and insurance rules that blunt patients' sensitivity to prices, and Medicare's higher payments for the same services when hospitals provide them. He concluded that "government does not need new powers to combat inefficient provider consolidation," and that "state legislatures and Congress need only stop encouraging" it.

=== Public health and the role of government ===
Cannon argues that government can play a legitimate role in health care when it protects people from harm that others impose on them. In a 2020 NPR interview about the COVID-19 pandemic, he described that role as "the same as the role of government when there isn't a health crisis, which is to protect us from people who would do us harm," adding that a deadly contagious disease can justify "additional steps." He developed the argument in a 2024 article in Social Philosophy and Policy. Because "nonconsensual transmission of dangerous pathogens is an inherently violent act," he wrote, government may intervene to contain disease for the same reasons it intervenes against other violence, but only to the extent its interventions "minimize the amount of violence in society," counting the coercion that public health measures themselves impose. He argued that this rule is "more egalitarian and welfare-enhancing" than a rule of minimizing loss of life.

=== Preventive care ===
In a 2016 essay in JAMA Internal Medicine, Cannon wrote that his grandfather had died of colorectal cancer when Cannon's mother was 13 years old, "a catastrophic event that tore his family apart." That grandfather, Eugene J. Butler, died in 1956 at age 54. Drawing on that family history, Cannon argued that official colorectal cancer screening guidelines offer little help to adults in their 40s with a family history of the disease, and that weighing the costs and benefits of a colonoscopy is "more difficult than the procedure itself."

=== Health insurance regulation ===
Cannon advocates expanding access to short-term health insurance and other plans exempt from Obamacare's regulations. He submitted public comments on the 2018 federal rule that extended the maximum duration of short-term, limited-duration insurance plans, and in 2020 co-wrote an amicus brief supporting the federal government in Association for Community Affiliated Plans v. Department of the Treasury, in which the D.C. Circuit upheld the rule. The district court and the D.C. Circuit both found that nothing in federal law limits how long consumers may keep short-term coverage; the appeals court held that "nothing in [federal law] prevents insurers from renewing expired" short-term policies. Cannon argues that Congress therefore left consumers free to buy "a product that turns short-term health insurance into long-term health insurance," and in a December 2025 briefing paper he drafted legislation that would write that interpretation into federal law.

In 2025 and 2026 he urged Congress to let Obamacare's enhanced premium subsidies expire and instead make such regulatory relief permanent. On January 11, 2026, President Donald Trump posted a summary of those recommendations on Truth Social, attributing them to Cannon by name: Congress should not extend the enhanced subsidies and should instead make Trump's 2018 short-term plan rule permanent. STAT reported that Trump wrote the post after meeting with Cannon, and that the same day Trump threatened to veto a clean three-year extension of the enhanced subsidies.

Cannon defends private health insurers while opposing the subsidies, tax preferences and regulatory barriers to entry that, he argues, shield them from competition and drive their least popular practices. In a 2025 U.S. News & World Report op-ed, he wrote that "the things that people hate about private health insurers are almost always things that the government encourages – and even requires – them to do," that "regulation won't solve this problem because regulation is the problem," and that insurers are "a wondrous force for good." In a December 2025 open letter to the sons of Brian Thompson, the UnitedHealthcare chief executive whom a gunman killed in 2024, he wrote that "the company your father led does an incomprehensible amount of good."

=== Tax treatment of health insurance ===
Cannon argues that the federal tax exclusion for employer-sponsored health insurance drives up health spending and ties coverage to employment. He calls the exclusion, which Treasury officials created in the 1920s after Congress enacted the federal income tax in 1913, "the original sin of U.S. health policy," and argues that it "has been the cause of nearly every problem with the U.S. health sector."

He has proposed converting the exclusion and all other health-related tax preferences into a single tax exclusion for deposits into worker-owned "universal health accounts" (UHAs), with revenue-neutral deposit limits. Workers could use the accounts to buy "any health insurance plan from any source, tax-free," and, he argues, would regain control of roughly $1 trillion in annual earnings that now flows to employer-provided health benefits.

In April 2026 he and Elizabeth J. Fowler, a Johns Hopkins University scholar who helped draft and implement the ACA, co-wrote an op-ed in The Washington Post calling the exclusion a root cause of unaffordable health care. They proposed that Congress "limit or cap" the exclusion, an approach similar to Obamacare's "Cadillac tax," a Democratic idea, while giving workers "greater control over health insurance spending by separating insurance from employment" through individual coverage health reimbursement arrangements (ICHRAs), "traditionally a Republican idea." They wrote that "a hybrid approach combining the two holds the most promise." That combination, a limited tax break that workers control, is the basic structure of Cannon's universal health accounts.

Writing for the American Enterprise Institute, Charles N. Kahn III said the two had "name[d] the right driver of costs" and "did the fiscal debate a service," though he argued that reforming the exclusion "would not, by itself, be enough" to slow health spending.

=== Drug and clinician regulation ===
Cannon calls for ending the government's power to require prescriptions. In a 2020 Cato white paper, he and physician Jeffrey Singer urged Congress to repeal the Durham-Humphrey Amendment, to "deny the FDA any power to impose prescription requirements," and to "eliminate premarket approval requirements for new drugs." Earlier that year he and Singer wrote in the Los Angeles Times that Congress should let pharmacies sell hormonal contraceptives over the counter. Writing in Rewire.News, Sarah Christopherson argued that such proposals formed part of a broader effort to weaken the FDA and that reproductive health advocates should treat them warily.

=== Medicare ===
Cannon argues that traditional Medicare harms the quality of medical care. In a 2022 Quinnipiac Health Law Journal article, he and Jacqueline Pohida wrote that Medicare's fee-for-service payment systems pay providers more "when complications occur as the result of error," discourage quality improvements that reduce the volume of services, and disadvantage integrated, prepaid health systems. Medicare, they wrote, "actively resists quality improvement." They proposed applying the principles of a public option to Medicare and giving enrollees the money Medicare would otherwise pay providers and insurers "as a monthly payment, just as Social Security does."

In a 2016 New York Times commentary, Cannon argued that converting Medicare into a cash-transfer program would let enrollees choose their own care and "eliminate nearly every Medicare rule put in place by special interests," concluding that Congress "should not voucher-ize Medicare. It should Social Securit-ize Medicare." In a 2025 podcast interview, he proposed dividing Medicare's roughly $1 trillion budget among enrollees as cash, with larger payments for lower-income and sicker enrollees, arguing that seniors spending their own money would demand lower prices and force providers to compete on quality.

=== Medicaid ===
Cannon argued against Medicaid expansion in testimony before several state legislatures. Since at least 2013, he has urged states, instead of expanding Medicaid, to seek federal waivers to run randomized experiments like the Oregon Health Insurance Experiment that would measure what enrollees and taxpayers gain from the program. He told Pennsylvania legislators that "no one bothered to measure Medicaid's effect on the health of enrollees until Oregon began a monumental new study in 2008—42 years and $9 trillion after the program's inception." In 2024 he repeated the recommendation to Kansas legislators, noting that in the decade since he first raised it, advocates of expansion could have pursued such a waiver. No state has taken up the recommendation.

=== Health care fraud ===
In a 2011 National Review article, Cannon argued that fraud will always remain intolerably high in government health programs because the people who run and use them "are spending other people's money." He wrote that Medicare works "like an ATM" for providers, reviews fewer than 5 percent of claims, and relies on "pay and chase"—trying to recover fraudulent payments after making them. Anti-fraud efforts fail, he argued, because they impose costs on beneficiaries and providers, "who, as voters and campaign donors respectively, have immense sway over politicians." Medicaid's matching grants compound the problem, because a state that reduces fraud keeps at most half of the savings. "Anti-fraud efforts will always be inadequate," he concluded, "when politicians spend other people's money."

=== Congressional Obamacare exemption ===
Cannon argues that the arrangement under which members of Congress and their staff receive Obamacare coverage is illegal. The ACA requires members and many of their staff to obtain coverage through an Exchange. To preserve their large employer contributions toward premiums, House and Senate officials submitted applications declaring each chamber a small business eligible for the District of Columbia's small-business (SHOP) Exchange.

In 2017 Cannon and Heritage Foundation legal scholar John Malcolm wrote that the officials involved "likely violated criminal laws, when they knowingly and repeatedly made false statements," and listed potential crimes including making false statements, conspiracy to defraud the United States, wire fraud and violations of the Sarbanes–Oxley Act. They wrote that when Senator David Vitter, as chairman of the Senate Small Business Committee, "sought to subpoena the names of the House and Senate officials who submitted the falsified documents," "five Republican senators joined every Democrat on that committee to quash that investigation into potential federal crimes." They also urged President Trump to end the exemption by executive action.

=== Medical malpractice ===
Cannon edited Medical Malpractice Litigation: How It Works, Why Tort Reform Hasn't Helped (2021), in which Bernard Black, David A. Hyman, Myungho Paik, William M. Sage and Charles Silver argue that conventional tort reform measures such as damage caps have not benefited patients. Former Senate Majority Leader Tom Daschle wrote the foreword. Cannon argues that on malpractice reform "Democrats come closer to libertarian principles than Republicans do." In a 2021 essay, he wrote that the malpractice system protects liberty by making negligent providers compensate the patients they injure, that Republicans "tend to take the side of defendants—i.e., physicians," and that "Republicans who pursue damage caps are limiting government at the expense of freedom."

=== Criticism of Republicans and agreement with Democrats ===
Cannon frequently criticizes Republicans on health policy. He argued in 2007 that Senator Orrin Hatch's proposed "MediKid" program, "like Medicare Part D," was "a Republican health care entitlement," and in 2008 wrote that in creating Medicare Part D, Republicans "may have done little more than slit their own throats." In 2011 he wrote that Mitt Romney "bears as much responsibility for Obamacare as any Democrat." When Republican governors began accepting Obamacare's Medicaid expansion in 2013, he told The Washington Post that "this is going to be a serious problem for them if they want to seek higher office." In 2016 he argued that House Republicans "would repeal ObamaCare only to replace it with slightly modified versions of that law's worst provisions." In 2025 he called Trump's executive order on "most favored nation" drug pricing "an attempt to impose government price controls on pharmaceuticals."

In a May 2016 HuffPost column, Cannon, who wrote that he had "left the GOP 20 years ago," criticized Republicans who were endorsing Donald Trump. He wrote that Trump's "divisive and degrading behavior toward women, Muslims, Mexicans, the handicapped, and others should disqualify someone from power," faulted Trump's threats to use presidential power against critics and the press, and wrote that while he did not know whether Trump would bring fascism to the United States, "he is what a fascist looks like at this stage of the process." He argued that the Republican Party would be better off after four years of opposing a Hillary Clinton administration than after Trump turned it into "a nativist, nationalist party," concluding that "Hillary Clinton is actually the more conservative candidate in the race."

Cannon has also found common ground with Democrats. He has said he supported the provisions of the Inflation Reduction Act, which passed with only Democratic votes, that reduced the prices Medicare pays for prescription drugs; he argued that a government setting the prices it pays as a purchaser differs from a price control, and that Republicans too often fall under the sway of the pharmaceutical lobby on the issue. In 2026 he agreed with Representative Alexandria Ocasio-Cortez that the FDA's long delay in approving modern sunscreen ingredients was a clear case of government overregulation. He has also argued that Democrats come closer than Republicans to libertarian principles on medical malpractice. Former Senate Majority Leader Tom Daschle, a Democrat, wrote the foreword to a book Cannon edited, and in 2026 Cannon co-wrote an op-ed with Elizabeth Fowler, who helped write the ACA.

=== Anti-Universal Coverage Club ===
In June 2007, Cannon launched the "Anti-Universal Coverage Club" on Cato's blog, a list of "scholars and citizens who reject the idea that government should ensure that all individuals have health insurance." Its manifesto argued that health policy "should focus on making health care of ever-increasing quality available to an ever-increasing number of people," that universal coverage "could be achieved only by forcing everyone to buy health insurance or by having government provide health insurance to all," and that "in a free society, people should have the right to refuse health insurance." Within two weeks Cannon counted 86 members, among them economists Arnold Kling and Thomas Saving and physician Jeffrey Singer.

National Journal reported that the club was "at odds not only with liberals but also with some conservatives," quoting Galen Institute president Grace-Marie Turner, who declined to join: "It's perception. If people think we're against having everyone have health insurance coverage, what kind of statement is that?" Writing at The Atlantic, Matthew Yglesias congratulated Cannon for taking on universal-coverage proponents "directly rather than [...] pretending that everyone agrees on the goals," while predicting that "politically, 'we don't care if you can't afford health insurance' is a losing slogan." The New Republic's Josh Patashnik faulted Cannon for criticizing California's 2007 health reform effort despite the manifesto's support for state experimentation.

In 2008, The New York Times reported that Cannon, who "used his blog to found the Anti-Universal Coverage Club," acknowledged research showing that coverage can improve health, but argued that no one knew whether universal coverage was the most cost-effective way to improve the nation's health. In 2012, Ezra Klein wrote in The Washington Post that the club's attitude "is now the norm within the Republican Party, even if it is rarely acknowledged so starkly." In 2015, New York's Jonathan Chait referred to Cannon as "the founder of the anti-Universal Coverage club" in a column criticizing him.

=== PolitiFact boycott ===
In April 2011, Cannon announced that he would no longer serve as a source for PolitiFact, which had often consulted him on health care claims. He objected to its "Lie of the Year" designations for the "death panels" claim (2009) and for calling the ACA a "government takeover" (2010), arguing that both fact-checks were "woefully incomplete" and that PolitiFact had "no factual basis for calling either statement a lie." In a January 2011 column, "Just Call Me Liar of the Year," he argued that the award "has proven as conducive to civil discourse as" Representative Joe Wilson's "You lie!" outburst during President Obama's 2009 address to Congress, and urged PolitiFact not to "continue to poison the well."

In November 2012, PolitiFact Georgia rated "False" Cannon's claim that "operating an Obamacare exchange would be illegal in 14 states," citing experts who said federal law overrides the state laws he relied on; Cannon, who declined to comment for the piece, replied that PolitiFact had analyzed "a claim I did not make and never would make."

=== Other writing ===
Some of Cannon's commentary ranges beyond health policy. Cannon has written exactly one health policy joke, which National Review published in 2007: "What do conservatives and Christian Scientists have in common? ... They don't do health care." In a 2015 Willamette Law Review essay, he posed as a time traveler from 2045 to predict a simpler, cheaper, more consumer-driven health sector.

In January 2013, he praised a passage in President Barack Obama's second inaugural address that linked the principle of equality to Seneca Falls, Selma and Stonewall, even as he criticized the administration's record on transparency and the rule of law. Two days later he urged fellow libertarians to celebrate those movements against government-backed oppression, suggesting that their silence might help explain why libertarianism attracted relatively few women and members of minority groups. In a 2020 essay he argued that libertarians should honor civil rights leader and congressman John Lewis as a "hero of liberty" despite their policy disagreements with him.

In December 2016, Cannon wrote in The Washington Post that Democrats could deny Donald Trump the presidency in the Electoral College if all 232 Democratic electors pledged to vote for a Republican alternative such as Mitt Romney; in that case, "it would take just 38 GOP electors to make that person the next president."

== Reception ==
=== Influence ===
Washingtonian wrote in 2022 that Cannon "regularly unfurls counterintuitive analysis" and in 2025 that he "has influenced Republican lawmakers' views on block grants for Medicaid and reducing government involvement in healthcare pricing." Journalists and opponents alike credit Cannon with outsized influence on Obamacare's implementation. Modern Healthcare called him "the intellectual father" of King v. Burwell, The Washington Post reported in 2014 that many regarded him as the main intellectual force behind the subsidy litigation, and Vox called him "the man who could bring down Obamacare." Maine state representative Sharon Treat, a Democrat, told The New Republic that Cannon's visit to neighboring New Hampshire had a chilling effect on efforts to build an Exchange in Maine. In 2015 The New Republic's Brian Beutler wrote that "where there are weaknesses in Obamacare, you will find him prodding."

=== Praise ===
The Washington Post called Cannon "an influential health-care wonk" in 2011, and in 2017 Post reporter David Weigel called him "the premier libertarian Obamacare critic." In a 2012 column, Ezra Klein wrote that he disagreed with Cannon, "who considers universal coverage an absurd and deleterious goal. But I take his analysis seriously, and his critiques have informed my thinking." Klein added, "I'm certainly more skeptical of single-payer programs than I would have been without having read his arguments." In 2015 Klein, writing in Vox, endorsed Cannon's criticism that Republicans had been "outplayed, again and again, on health care," writing, "Cannon is right." In 2019 Philip Klein of the Washington Examiner described him as "a leading opponent of Obamacare." Economist David R. Henderson has called him "a first-rate health economist."

=== Criticism ===
Supporters of Obamacare characterize Cannon's work as an effort to undermine the law. In a 2013 profile under the headline "Obamacare's Single Most Relentless Antagonist", MacGillis argued that Cannon's campaign against state Exchanges had contributed to the problems of HealthCare.gov's launch and to public disenchantment with the law. Lemieux described Cannon as "ObamaCare's fiercest critic" while arguing that the King case was a "scam," and health care writer Wendell Potter, writing for the Center for Public Integrity, criticized Cato's support for a case that could leave millions of people unable to afford insurance.

Los Angeles Times business columnist Michael Hiltzik has repeatedly criticized Cannon. In April 2014, he called a Cannon column arguing that Obamacare gave enrollees incentives to drop coverage and re-enroll once sick "the dopiest entry" among conservative critiques of the law, and accused Cannon of advising Americans to go uninsured. Cannon replied that he wanted people "to have stable, secure health insurance" and was warning that Obamacare "creates so many incentives for people to free-ride that insurance markets could collapse." Hiltzik responded with a second column accusing Cannon of "utter cluelessness about the whole point of having health insurance." In 2015 Hiltzik argued that the King case "never should have been filed," noting that Cannon had tried to recruit former Cato interns as plaintiffs and that none joined the suit.

After the King decision, New York's Jonathan Chait wrote that Cannon, "the founder of the anti-Universal Coverage club," had "nurtured hopes of un-insuring 6 million Americans," likened him to a despondent Montgomery Burns, and accused him of clinging to "a chimerical, never-implemented, doomed-to-fail alternative" version of the law.

=== Recognition ===
- The Hill, "100 People to Watch This Fall" (2013)
- American Health Line, "Top Health Care Movers & Shakers of 2014"
- Washingtonian, "Washington's Most Influential People": 2021, 2022, 2023, 2024, 2025, 2026

== Selected works ==
=== Books ===
- Cannon, Michael F.; Tanner, Michael D. (2005). Healthy Competition: What's Holding Back Health Care and How to Free It (1st ed.). Washington, D.C.: Cato Institute. (2nd ed., 2007)
- Cannon, Michael F. (2023). Recovery: A Guide to Reforming the U.S. Health Sector. Washington, D.C.: Cato Institute. ISBN 978-1-952223-84-6.

=== As editor ===
- Kling, Arnold (2006). Crisis of Abundance: Rethinking How We Pay for Health Care. Cato Institute.
- Hyman, David A. (2006). Medicare Meets Mephistopheles. Cato Institute.
- Cannon, Michael F.; Tanner, Michael D., eds. (2012). Replacing ObamaCare: The Cato Institute on Health Care Reform. Cato Institute.
- Silver, Charles; Hyman, David A. (2018). Overcharged: Why Americans Pay Too Much for Health Care. Cato Institute.
- Black, Bernard; Hyman, David A.; Paik, Myungho; Sage, William M.; Silver, Charles (2021). Medical Malpractice Litigation: How It Works, Why Tort Reform Hasn't Helped. Foreword by Tom Daschle. Cato Institute.

=== Selected articles ===
- Cannon, Michael F. (2007). "Pay-for-Performance: Is Medicare a Good Candidate?". Yale Journal of Health Policy, Law, and Ethics. 7 (1): 1–38.
- Cannon, Michael F. (2008). "Large Health Savings Accounts: A Step toward Tax Neutrality for Health Care". Forum for Health Economics & Policy. 11 (2).
- Adler, Jonathan H.; Cannon, Michael F. (2013). "Taxation Without Representation: The Illegal IRS Rule to Expand Tax Credits under the PPACA". Health Matrix. 23 (1): 119–195.
- Adler, Jonathan H.; Cannon, Michael F. (2015). "King v. Burwell: Desperately Seeking Ambiguity in Clear Statutory Text". Journal of Health Politics, Policy and Law. 40 (3): 577–588.
- Cannon, Michael F. (2015). "Health Care's Future Is So Bright, I Gotta Wear Shades". Willamette Law Review. 51 (4): 559–571.
- Cannon, Michael F. (2016). "Ascertaining Costs and Benefits of Colonoscopy More Difficult Than the Procedure Itself". JAMA Internal Medicine. 176 (8): 1055–1056.
- Cannon, Michael F.; Pohida, Jacqueline (2022). "Would 'Medicare for All' Mean Quality for All? How Public-Option Principles Could Reverse Medicare's Negative Impact on Quality". Quinnipiac Health Law Journal. 25 (2): 181–258.
- Cannon, Michael F. (2024). "Public Health as If People Mattered". Social Philosophy and Policy. 41 (2): 480–504. doi:10.1017/S026505252400027X.
- Cannon, Michael F. (2025). "U.S. Health Care: The Free-Market Myth". National Affairs.
