= Oregon Experiment =

Oregon Experiment may refer to

- Oregon Medicaid health experiment, a study of Medicaid
- The Oregon Experiment, a book about campus community planning
