= ISRP =

ISRP may refer to:

- Irish Socialist Republican Party, a defunct political party in Ireland.
- the individual mandate in the Patient Protection and Affordable Care Act in the United States, known as the individual shared responsibility provision.
