= Timothy Carney =

Timothy Carney may refer to:

- Timothy M. Carney (1944–2026), American diplomat and consultant
- Timothy P. Carney, American newspaper columnist and author
