= Bronze plan =

Bronze plan may refer to:

- An offering of the United States' Patient Protection and Affordable Care Act defined as covering 60 percent of out-of-pocket costs
  - The premium for such a plan as a maximum payment on a United States tax return under the Internal Revenue Service's Affordable Care Act tax provisions when a taxpayer does not have a health plan.
- An affiliation level launched in May 2009 by NBCUniversal Television Group
