= Premium tax credit =

Government subsidy for health insurance in the United States

The premium tax credit (PTC) is a mechanism established by the Affordable Care Act (ACA) through which the United States federal government partially subsidizes the cost of private health insurance for certain lower- and middle-income individuals and families. The PTC is a refundable tax credit, and may be applied directly to the cost of insurance premiums.

The PTC is one of a host of ACA tax provisions and was first made available in 2014; it aims to make insurance affordable for lower- and middle-income U.S. residents who do not receive insurance through their employer and whose household income is too high to qualify for Medicaid. The PTC is only available to those who purchase insurance through the ACA-established health exchanges and meet the law's household income eligibility requirements. Under the ACA, only those households earning between 100% and 400% of the federal poverty level (FPL) are eligible to receive the PTC, although the American Rescue Plan Act and Inflation Reduction Act temporarily extended PTC eligibility to those making more than 400% of the FPL from 2021 through 2025. In 2023, more than 14 million people received the premium tax credit.

== History ==
The eligibility criteria for the premium tax credit is determined by section 1401 of the Affordable Care Act (Obamacare). The Act was signed into law on March 23, 2010, and specified that the credits are only available to individuals and families who have enrolled in a health plan offered on a healthcare exchange. On May 23, 2012, the Internal Revenue Service (IRS) adopted a regulation that said tax credits would be made available to eligible individuals who enroll in a health plan through either a state or a federally-facilitated exchange. The IRS based this on their interpretation of Section 1401.

On June 11, 2012 the IRS published Internal Revenue Bulletin: 2012-24 which obtains the final regulations that amend the Income Tax Regulations (26 CFR part 1) under section 36B relating to the PTC.

In November 2014 the IRS commissioner, John Koskinen, spoke at an AICPA conference. He said the IRS requested $430 million from the United States Congress to implement provisions required by the ACA. The IRS did not receive any money for this purpose and is now operating on a budget 7% lower than its 2010 budget. He mentioned two major provisions of this Act, the Premium tax credit and the individual shared responsibility payment as two new items that have to be implemented on 1040 tax forms.

=== Legal challenge ===
Under the provisions of the ACA, separate health exchanges operate for residents of each state and for the District of Columbia; only those people who purchase insurance through the exchanges are eligible for premium tax credits. The drafters of the legislation envisioned that the exchanges would be operated by the state governments, but included a fallback provision for federally-run exchanges in states that did not establish exchanges on their own. In the event, however, most of the exchanges are not run by the states; as of 2023, 30 are operated by the federal government.

Due to the complex legislative history of the ACA, the final text of the ACA was ambiguous on certain points, and could be read to imply that only those who bought insurance through an exchange run by a state government would qualify for premium tax credits. This ambiguity was the subject of a number of lawsuits that were part of a broader campaign of legal challenges against the ACA. Had the challenges regarding the premium tax credits succeeded, the subsidy that was one of the key provisions of the ACA would've been unavailable to most people who the framers of the law intended to receive it. The suits on this topic were ultimately consolidated in King v. Burwell, in which the Supreme Court ruled 6–3 in 2015 that the tax credits were clearly integral to the law's functioning, and that "the pertinent statutory phrase" ought to be interpreted in a manner "that is compatible with the rest of the law." This ruling ensured that anyone purchasing insurance from any of the exchanges would be potentially eligible for premium tax credits.

== PTC eligibility and calculation ==
The calculation of the PTC is a complex process that takes a number of factors into account. In general, the system of individual insurance plans purchased through exchanges created by the ACA was intended to supplement rather than replace the United States' primarily employment-based insurance system, and those who can receive insurance from their or a family member's employer are not eligible for the PTC, unless the employee's share of the premium is more than 8.39% of their household income.

Only those households whose income is between 100% and 400% of the federal poverty level are eligible to receive the PTC. The FPL varies based on household size and is adjusted annually for inflation; in 2023, the FPL for a one-person household was $14,850 and for a four-person household was $30,000 in the contiguous 48 states (a somewhat higher measure is used in Alaska and Hawaii). (The framers of the ACA intended those making less than 100% of the FPL to be covered by Medicaid; but not all states used the provisions of the ACA to expand their Medicaid programs as anticipated, giving rise to a Medicaid coverage gap whereby some households have incomes too high to qualify for Medicaid but not high enough to receive subsidies via the PTC.)

An eligible individual or household purchasing insurance through a health exchange can receive the PTC if the cost of a "silver" insurance plan, defined by the ACA as a plan whose premiums cover 70% of the insured's health care costs, would exceed a set percentage of their income; this income percentage ranges from 2% for those making 100% of the FPL to 9.6% for those making 400%. The PTC subsidizes the difference between the cost of the plan and the law's assessment of a household's ability to pay; because the cost of insurance can vary widely depending on the age and home address of the insured, the PTC can also vary depending on those factors, even for two families of the same size and income.

Because insurance plans for many households, especially those with older members, cost more than 9.6% of 400% of the poverty level, the ACA's provisions for the PTC created a benefits cliff, whereby a household that saw an income boost that put them over the 400% line could see a big jump in the cost of their health insurance, turning that income increase into an effective decrease in their take-home income. The provisions of the American Rescue Plan and Inflation Reduction Act temporarily eliminated this cliff by doing away with the 400% limit on PTC eligibility, and also reduced the maximum percentage of income that anyone receiving the PTC would pay for a silver plan from 9.6% to 8.5%. However, the benefits cliff returned with expiry of the provisions of the IRA at the end of 2025.

=== PTC calculation algorithm ===
To calculate the PTC, the following steps are generally followed:

1. Determine the applicable percentage: The applicable percentage is based on the individual or family's household income as a percentage of the federal poverty level for their family size. This percentage is used to cap the amount of income individuals and families are expected to contribute toward their health insurance premiums.
2. Determine the premium benchmark: The premium benchmark is the second-lowest-cost silver plan premium available in the individual or family's area through their local health exchange. This benchmark is used as a reference point for calculating the PTC.
3. Calculate the maximum PTC: The maximum PTC is determined by subtracting the expected contribution, based on the applicable percentage of income, from the premium benchmark. This represents the maximum subsidy the individual or family can receive.
4. Calculate the actual PTC: The actual PTC is the lesser of the maximum PTC calculated in the previous step or the actual premium paid by the individual or family for the qualified health plan.

The PTC is then claimed on the individual or family's federal income tax return, and may reduce the amount of tax owed or increase the amount of the tax refund. Calculation is subject to specific rules and regulations set by the Internal Revenue Service (IRS).

An estimate of the credit may also be applied in advance to insurance premiums as they're paid. However, the precise amount of a household's PTC can only be calculated based on the full year's income, and the difference between the estimated and actual credit is taken into account on the household's tax return. In the 2015 tax year, 1.6 million taxpayers overestimated the amount they were supposed to receive for the advance tax premium; the average amount owed was $800.

== IRS forms ==
The IRS introduced several new forms connected with the Premium tax credit (PTC):

- Form 8962, the Premium Tax Credit (PTC) must be filed with a 1040 income tax return by individuals who already received advance subsidies through a healthcare exchange. The form was released by the IRS on November 17, 2014, without accompanying instructions.
- Form 8965, Health Coverage Exemptions
- Three forms: 1095-A, 1095-B, 1095-C will be issued, respectively, by a health exchange, insurance company or an employer to taxpayers. The taxpayer will rely on these forms for proof satisfying the individual mandate. For the tax year 2014 only Form 1095-A provided by a health insurance exchange is required by the IRS.
