= Affordable Care Act tax provisions =

In 2014, the Internal Revenue Service (IRS) introduced a host of tax provisions to accommodate the Affordable Care Act.

Robert W. Wood wrote in Forbes that the relationship between tax filing and obtaining health insurance may cause mixed feelings. Some are expected to feel they have benefited, but others may feel burdened by additional costs and/or filing requirements.

== Premium Tax Credits ==
The Premium Tax Credit (PTC) is a refundable tax credit, payable by the Internal Revenue Service (IRS) to qualifying individuals who have obtained healthcare insurance through a healthcare exchange (marketplace) in the tax year. It can be paid in advance directly to a healthcare insurance company to offset the cost of monthly health insurance premiums. For the 2015 tax year 1.6 million taxpayers overestimated the amount they were supposed to receive for the advance tax premium. The average amount owing was $800.

== Cost-sharing subsidies ==
Households with (Modified Adjusted Gross) income of 100-250% of the Federal poverty level (FPL) may also receive cost-sharing subsidies if they are enrolled in a silver plan through a healthcare exchange. The subsidy reduces the amount a household must pay out-of-pocket.

== Individual Shared Responsibility Provision ==
Starting in 2014 all tax-filers must have healthcare insurance.

Tax-filers who obtain qualifying healthcare insurance receive a 1095 form from an employer, a healthcare insurance company, or a healthcare exchange (marketplace). The 1095 serves as proof that the individual has obtained healthcare insurance. For the tax year 2014 only Form 1095-A provided by a healthcare exchange is required by the IRS.

Individuals who were not insured during the tax year are required to make a payment when filing their tax return, unless they qualify for a tax exemption. An exemption certificate number is required in some cases for obtaining an exemption on a tax return. In 2014 the payment amount was 1% of income or $95 per adult ($47.50 per child) limited to a family maximum of $285 (national average premium for a bronze plan), whichever is greater. In 2015 the penalty increased to $285 per adult or 2% of income above the limit.

The New York Times reported in February 2015 that up to six million uninsured taxpayers are expected to have to pay a penalty for not obtaining health insurance in 2014.

=== Americans residing outside the United States ===
Americans permanently residing outside the United States are exempt from the requirement to obtain health coverage in the United States. However they must file Form 8965 to obtain an exemption. Failure to file this form may result in a tax penalty.

=== American citizens and American residents residing outside the United States ===
American citizens and American residents residing outside the United States for part of the year can also get an exemption but only if they reside outside the U.S. for more than 330 full days during a twelve-month period.

=== Canadians residing in the United States part of the year ===
There have been some changes that may affect Canadians who reside in the United States part of the year:

- In June 2014 a new cooperative program between Canada and the United States titled the Entry/Exit Initiative of the Perimeter Security and Economic Competitiveness Action Plan went into effect.
- If a Canadian person spends more than 182 days within a calendar year in the United States, they may be considered a U.S. Person for tax purposes under IRS rules.
- Canadians who spend more than 182 days within a calendar year in the United States, can try to overturn U.S.-person-status by filing Form 8840 no later than June 15 of the year the tax return must be filed.
- Being a U.S. person may have damaging tax effects on Canadians, because they must file U.S. tax returns on their world-wide income (even if none of the income is derived in the United States).
- Even those who owe no tax may be faced with large costs associated with filing complicated tax returns in both Canada and the United States, including such forms such as FBAR and form 8965.

== Small Business Health Care tax credits ==
Starting in 2015 Small Business Health Care tax credits are available to small businesses (25 employees or less) who obtain a qualified health plan offered through a Small Business Health Options Program (SHOP) Marketplace.

== Net investment income tax ==
Higher income taxpayers, as well as taxpayers with sources of income that are defined as net investment income in the statute, pay an additional 3.8% tax to offset the costs of the Affordable Care Act. This tax first took effect in 2013. At the time, "higher income taxpayers" were defined as taxpayers with a modified adjusted gross income of $250,000 for married couples filing jointly, $125,000 for married couples filing separately, and $200,000 for individuals or heads of household. As of 2023, the thresholds have remained the same since 2013 and are not indexed to inflation the way the regular tax brackets are. The tax is applied on income from interest, dividends, rents, royalties, passive activities, and gain from the sale of most properties.

== See also ==
- Individual shared responsibility provision
