= Form 1095 =

IRS tax form

Form 1095 is a collection of Internal Revenue Service (IRS) tax forms in the United States which are used to determine whether an individual is required to pay the individual shared responsibility provision. Individuals can also use the health insurance information contained in the form/forms to help them fill out their tax returns. The individual forms are Form 1095-A "A Health Insurance Marketplace Statement", Form 1095-B "Health Coverage", and Form 1095-C "Employer-Provided Health Insurance Offer and Coverage". Individuals may receive one or multiple versions of Form 1095.

== Background ==
The Affordable Care Act, or Obamacare, includes both the individual mandate and the employer mandate. The individual mandate requires that most Americans have qualifying healthcare coverage or potentially face a fine. The employer mandate requires employers with 50 or more full-time equivalent employees to offer healthcare coverage to their full-time employees or potentially face a fine. Form 1095 determines whether the employee or the employer have to pay a fine for failing to meet the individual mandate and the employer mandate, respectively.

Form 1095 is filed by whoever provided health insurance coverage to an individual, which means that individuals don't have to fill out Form 1095 themselves.

Form 1095 contains individual health insurance information. Individuals can use the information on Form 1095 to fill the "Health care: individual responsibility" line on Forms 1040, 1040A or 1040EZ. For example, if an individual fails to meet adequate medical coverage, and does not qualify for any exemptions, they will enter the shared responsibility payment amount on that line in the 1040 Forms. Form 1095 is also used to fill out Form 8962 (premium tax credit) and Form 8965 (health coverage exemptions).

== Receiving Form 1095 ==
Form 1095 is sent to the individual by whoever provides them with health insurance, be it the health insurance marketplace for Form 1095-A; a government program, small self-funded group, or small business for Form 1095-B; or by their (50+ full-time employees) employer for Form 1095-C.

Form 1095-A may have implications for resolving differences between estimated and actual health insurance subsidies for marketplace plans. By contrast, Forms 1095-B and 1095-C are only sent to the individual and for his or her own reference, and the individual does not need to send them to the IRS, their employer, or anyone else for that matter.

Form 1095 is typically to be received by the individual by the beginning of February; however, in 2015 many individuals received Form 1095 later than expected, due to delays. 2016 is likely to have less delays.

== Individual shared responsibility provision ==
Starting January 2014, an individual and his or her family must have health insurance coverage throughout the year. Individuals may be exempt from health insurance coverage if:

- The minimum amount they must pay for annual premiums is more than eight percent of their household income,
- They have a gap in coverage for less than three consecutive months,
- They belong to a group that is explicitly exempt from participating in the Affordable Care Act,
- They qualify for an exemption for one of several other reasons, such as a hardship that prevents them from obtaining coverage.

If an individual and his or her family don't have health insurance and don't qualify for any exemptions, they will be required to make the individual shared responsibility payment.

== Types ==
=== Form 1095-A Health Insurance Marketplace Statement ===
Individuals with a health insurance marketplace plan receive Form 1095-A. Note that this form comes from the marketplace, not the IRS. The form includes the individual's and their dependents' name, the amount of coverage they have, any tax credits they are entitled to and whether they used them to pay for health insurance, and the amount they paid in total for coverage. An individual can use the Form 1095-A they receive to complete their income tax filing, adjust tax credit payments, and claim any premium tax credits that may be due or repaid.

=== Form 1095-B Health Coverage ===
Employers with fewer than 50 full-time employees that offer health coverage, as well as health care insurance providers, send the 1095-B form to members of their health insurance plans. 1095-B includes the type of coverage the individual has, dependents covered, and the period of the coverage. Form 1095-B is used to verify on tax returns that an individual and his or her dependents have at least minimum essential coverage (MEC).

=== Form 1095-C Employer-Provided Health Insurance Offer and Coverage ===
Form 1095-C is used by larger companies with 50 or more full-time or full-time equivalent employees. This form is used by the employee to report the healthcare coverage offered to them by his or her employer. The IRS uses the information on it to determine whether the employee or the employer have to pay a fine for failing to meet the healthcare coverage requirements under the ACA.

== See also ==
- Individual shared responsibility provision
- Affordable Care Act tax provisions
- Premium tax credit
