= Katherine Baicker =

American economist

Kate Baicker

15th Provost of the University of Chicago
- Incumbent
- Assumed office March 20, 2023
- Preceded by: Ka Yee Lee

Personal details
- Born: May 23, 1971 (age 54)
- Education: Yale University (BA); Harvard University (MA, PhD)
- Scientific career
- Fields: Public administration, economics
- Thesis: Fiscal federalism and social insurance (1998)

Katherine Baicker (born May 23, 1971) is an American economist, currently serving as the 15th provost of the University of Chicago since March 2023. She is known for the Oregon Medicaid health experiment.

== Biography ==
Baicker received a Bachelor of Arts with a major in economics from Yale University in 1993 and a Ph.D. in economics from Harvard University in 1998. Her doctoral dissertation was on public administration and economics, titled Fiscal federalism and social insurance (1998).

Baicker began her academic career teaching economics at Dartmouth College from 1998 to 2005 and her political career in 2001, serving as a senior economist for the President's Council of Economic Advisors. From 2005 to 2007, she taught public policy at the University of California Los Angeles School of Public Affairs. During this period she rejoined the Council of Economic Advisors as a congressionally confirmed chief economist. In 2007 she moved to Harvard University where she held positions in the Harvard Kennedy School and the Harvard T.H. Chan School of Public Health until 2017 when she accepted the position of dean at the Harris School of Public Policy at the University of Chicago.

She serves on the editorial boards of Health Affairs, the Journal of Health Economics, and the Forum for Health Economics and Policy; as vice chair of the board of directors of AcademyHealth; on the Congressional Budget Office's Panel of Health Advisers; and was a commissioner on the Medicare Payment Advisory Commission. She is a director at Eli Lilly and Company.

In March 2023, she was appointed as the 15th Provost of the University of Chicago.

== Research ==
Her research areas include health economics, welfare, and public finance, with a particular focus on the financing of health insurance, spending on public programs, and fiscal federalism.

She believes in Medicare copayments as a way of reducing medical spending on unnecessary care. Copayments should be limited to a maximum patient contribution, to avoid patients having to pay catastrophic expenses that would defeat the purpose of insurance. Medicare clients should not have to buy supplemental insurance to avoid that risk. But copayments should be low for services that are effective at improving health.

Her research has been published in journals such as Health Affairs, the Journal of Public Economics, and the Quarterly Journal of Economics, and has been featured in the New York Times, the Wall Street Journal, Business Week, and on National Public Radio. She is currently one of the leaders of a research program investigating the many effects of expanding health insurance coverage in the context of a randomized Medicaid expansion in Oregon.

== See also ==
- Oregon Medicaid health experiment
