= Timothy P. Carney =

American political writer

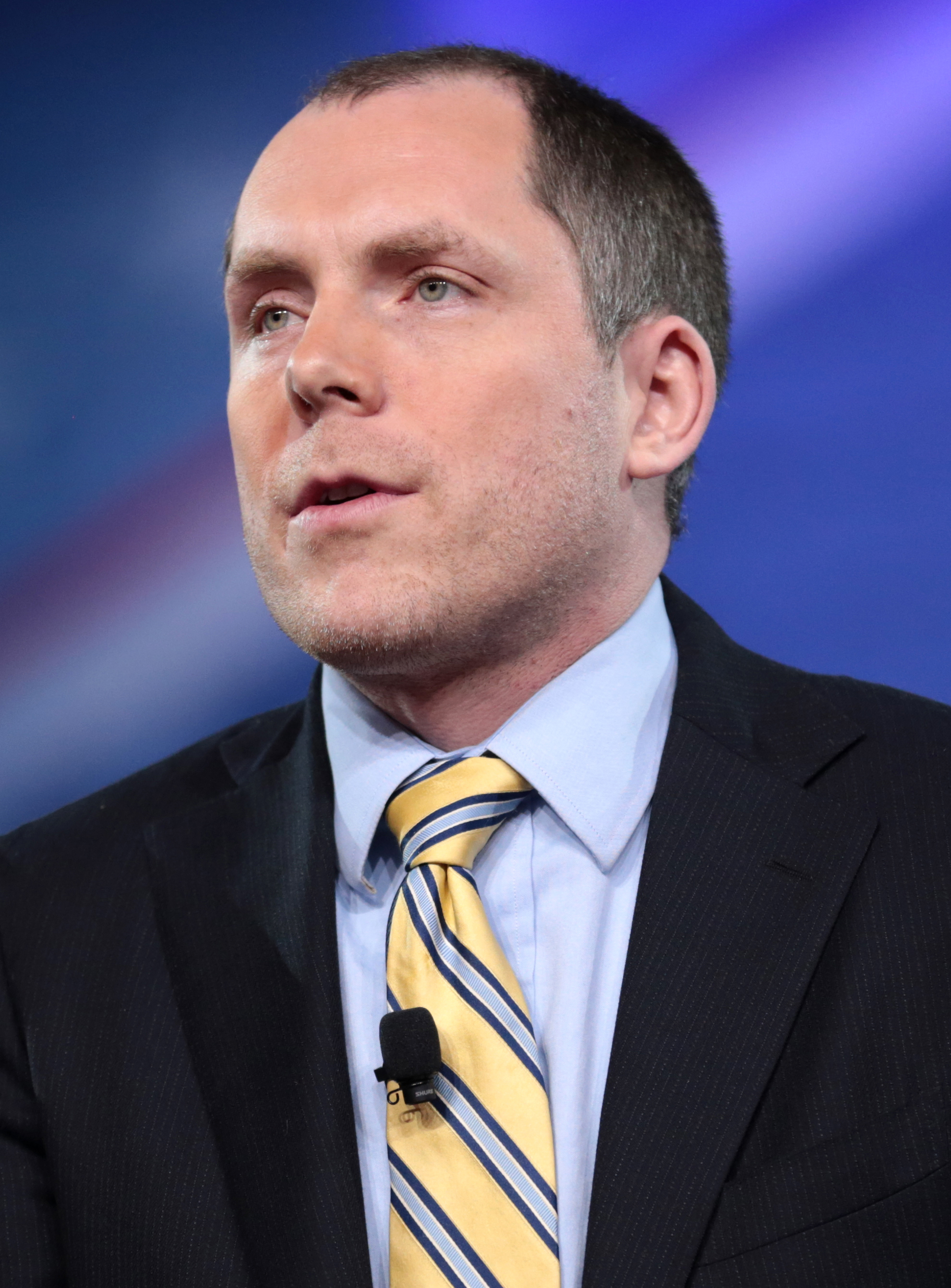
Carney speaking at the Conservative Political Action Conference

Timothy P. Carney is an American newspaper columnist and author. He is the senior political columnist at the Washington Examiner. He is a senior fellow at the American Enterprise Institute. He has a BA from St. John’s College in Annapolis.

== Books ==
- Family Unfriendly: How Our Culture Made Raising Kids Much Harder Than It Needs to Be (Harper, 2024)
- Alienated America: Why Some Places Thrive While Others Collapse (HarperCollins, 2019)
- Obamanomics: How Barack Obama Is Bankrupting You and Enriching His Wall Street Friends, Corporate Lobbyists, and Union Bosses (Regnery Publishing, 2009)
- The Big Ripoff: How Big Business and Big Government Steal Your Money (John Wiley & Sons, 2006)
