= Oregon Medicaid health experiment =

Research study on Medicaid expansion

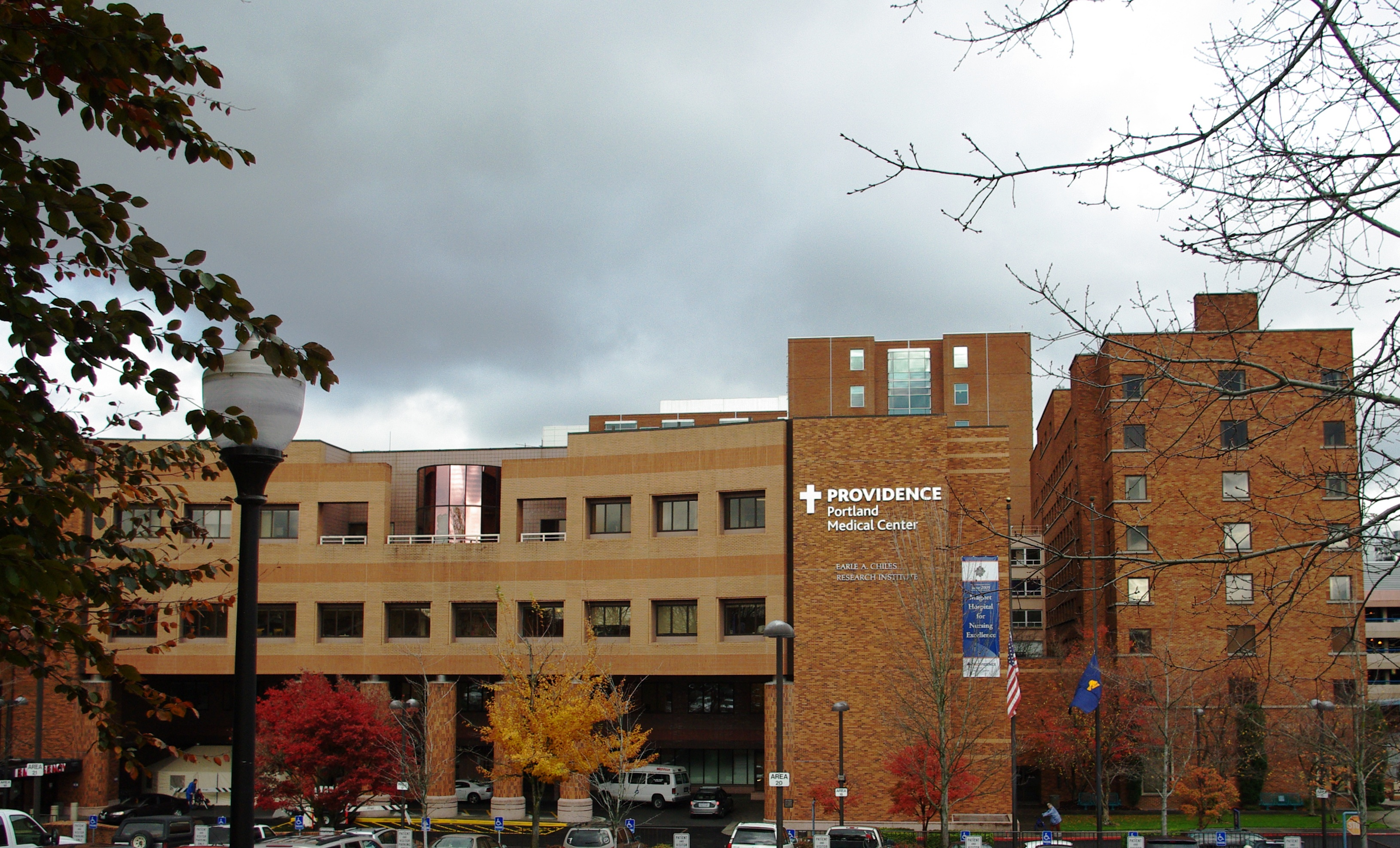
A major part of the study took place at the Providence Portland Medical Center.

The Oregon health insurance experiment (sometimes abbreviated OHIE) was a research study looking at the effects of the 2008 Medicaid expansion in the U.S. state of Oregon, which occurred based on lottery drawings from a waiting list and thus offered an opportunity to conduct a randomized experiment by comparing a control group of lottery losers to a treatment group of winners, who were eligible to apply for enrollment in the Medicaid expansion program after previously being uninsured.

The study's results have been published in the academic journals The Quarterly Journal of Economics, Science, The New England Journal of Medicine, and The American Economic Review. In the first year after the lottery, Medicaid coverage was associated with higher rates of health care use, a lower probability of having medical debts sent to a collection agency, and higher self-reported mental and physical health. In the 18 months following the lottery, researchers found that Medicaid increased emergency department visits.

Approximately two years after the lottery, researchers found that Medicaid had no statistically significant impact on physical health measures, but "it did increase use of health care services, raise rates of diabetes detection and management, lower rates of depression, and reduce financial strain."

Commentators in publications such as Forbes and RealClearPolitics cited the study as evidence that the Medicaid program fails its central cause of assisting the American poor, but other commentators in publications such as The New Republic and the Daily Kos stated that the evidence of improved financial security and mental health provided a significant social benefit.

== Background ==
In 2008, Oregon began an expansion of its Medicaid program for low-income adults. Because officials could not afford coverage for all those who wanted to enroll, they decided on the novel approach of allocating the limited number of available slots by lottery. Thus, a situation allowing for a randomized experiment occurred, with a control group of individuals not selected by the lottery and a treatment group of individuals selected by the lottery and thus eligible to apply for Medicaid.

A total of 29,835 Oregonians were given the opportunity to apply for the state's Medicaid program out of almost 90,000 people on the waitlist. About 30% of those who were selected from the waitlist both chose to apply for Medicaid and met the eligibility criteria. Researchers collected data from both existing administrative data sources and new primary sources. Administrative data included hospital discharge, emergency department, credit report, and mortality records and records on receipt of state and federal benefits. The researchers also conducted a mail survey approximately one year after the lottery and conducted in-person interviews and physical-health exams. For logistical reasons, data on emergency-department visits was limited to twelve Portland-area hospitals and in-person data collection was limited to study participants in the Portland metropolitan area.

The control and study groups were statistically similar in many dimensions such as age and ethnicity. Because of the randomized controlled design, the study was able to isolate the effects of insurance from confounding factors such as the initial health status of participants. Principal investigators Katherine Baicker and Amy Finkelstein are well known as economists at Harvard University and the Massachusetts Institute of Technology, respectively. The rest of the authors are regarded as some of the top researchers in this field.

== Findings ==
The researchers compared lottery winners who had the chance to enroll in Medicaid to individuals not selected in the lottery, using a standard two-stage least-squares instrumental-variable regression from their data to assess the effect of Medicaid coverage on many outcomes, including health care use, financial strain, and mental and physical health.

In the first year of coverage, researchers found that Medicaid coverage increased health care use, including hospital admissions, prescription drug use, and outpatient visits. Medicaid coverage was associated with a 2.1 percentage point (30%) increase in the likelihood of having a hospital admission, an 8.8 percentage point (15%) increase in the likelihood of taking any prescription drugs, and a 21 percentage point (35%) increase in the likelihood of having an outpatient visit. Medicaid coverage also increased the likelihood of receiving recommended preventive care, including an 18.7 percentage point (60%) increase in having a mammogram within the past year for women over 40. Medicaid coverage reduced, by 6.4 percentage points, (25%) the probability of having an unpaid medical bill sent to a collection agency and, by 20 percentage points, (35%) the probability of having any out-of-pocket medical expenditures.

Over an 18-month period following the lottery, Medicaid coverage increased emergency department use by 0.41 visits per person, a 40% increase. Researchers found increases across a range of different types of visits, including visits classified as preventable or primary care treatable, and across different subgroups.

From in-person interviews and physical health exams after about two years of coverage, researchers examined patient health issues including depression, high blood pressure, elevated cholesterol, high glycated hemoglobin levels, and long-term cardiovascular risks (the latter using the Framingham risk score). The study found no statistically significant impact of Medicaid coverage on any of the four physical measures. However, there were statistically insignificant improvements associated with Medicaid coverage in every single category, with a 1.33 percentage point (8%) decrease in high blood pressure incidence, a 2.43 percentage point (17%) decrease in high cholesterol incidence, a .93 percentage point (18%) decrease in high glycated hemoglobin incidence, and a 0.21 percentage point (2.5%) decrease in Framingham risk score. Based on the findings, the researchers could reject, with 95% confidence, the decrease in blood pressure that would be expected based on previous studies of the effect of Medicaid coverage. The study found that Medicaid increased the rates of being diagnosed with diabetes and of using medication for diabetes. The researchers could not reject the decrease in blood sugar that would be expected to result from the increased use of diabetes medication, based on the clinical literature. The study reported that Medicaid coverage was associated with significantly lower rates of screening positive for depression (a 9 percentage point decline) despite the fact that there "was no significant increase in the use of medication for depression."

On average, Medicaid coverage increased annual medical spending by approximately $1,172 relative to spending in the control group. The researchers looked at mortality rates, but they could not reach any conclusions because of the extremely low death rate of the general population of able-bodied Oregon adults aged 19 to 64.

== Limitations ==
The study had significant limitations. The population examined was from only one state, and data collection involving in-person interviews and physical exams was limited to the Portland metropolitan area. The study looked at results over a two-year period and the limited sample size generated limitations in statistical power.

The study outcomes were considered in the context of the Affordable Care Act (ACA) and how the ACA may impact states' Medicaid expansion. Although the authors addressed and described the Oregon expansion population (100% of poverty, self-selection to apply for the program lottery, etc.), they did not examine the possible differences in the expansion for the population between 100% and 138% of poverty. Also, it will be important to consider how Oregon's healthcare delivery system is pertinent in the context of the ACA.

== Response and commentary ==
Avik Roy wrote for Forbes that the reported "result calls into question the $450 billion a year we spend on Medicaid, and the fact that Obamacare throws 11 million more Americans into this broken program." He remarked as well that "if relieving financial strain is all we are trying to do, we’d be better off giving poor people the cash and letting them spend it how they choose." Michael F. Cannon, director of health policy studies at the Cato Institute, wrote for RealClearPolitics that the "study shows there is absolutely no warrant to expand Medicaid at all."

Megan McArdle stated in The Daily Beast that "it's hard for me to look at this study and see the kinds of numbers that save tens of thousands of lives every year" even though proponents of expanded Medicaid as a part of health care reform had claimed so. In addition, she labeled the study "bombshell new." The editorial board of The Wall Street Journal argued that "Federal Medicaid rules require states to offer all-you-can-eat benefits to everyone rather than targeting public assistance to those most in need." National Review Online ran a commentary by Jeremy Rozansky, who argued that "Medicaid is clearly a poor use of hundreds of billions of dollars." Kevin Drum wrote for Mother Jones that even though the positive patient health results of being on Medicaid did not pass statistical significance at the 95% level, the results mattered at other levels that he saw as more appropriate.

The New Republic ran an article by Jonathan Cohn arguing, "The Oregon study can't disprove that Medicaid produced physical health benefits, because it can't pinpoint the results with enough precision." He also stated that the result of "large improvements in mental health were just as surprising to the researchers as the lack of large improvements in physical health.... Not only might better mental health save some money, given the costs to society of lost productivity and activity. It should also save lives." Joan McCarter of the Daily Kos asserted that expanding "Medicaid to more people absolutely doesn't hurt public health" since extending "the security of having access to affordable health care has absolutely improved the mental health and the financial security of the people who received it" since she views that "the point of health insurance."

John McDonough of the Harvard School of Public Health, writing for The Boston Globe remarked, "These results have changed no one's mind about Medicaid... because, in the end, this is not a debate about numbers or data or studies." According to McDonough, "This is a debate about values." Ben Domenech, managing editor of Health Care News and fellow of the Heartland Institute, commentated that the moderate changes in depression found in the study from Medicaid could have been exceeded by having all of the patients adopt a pet, which significantly lowers depression and reduces the risk of heart disease, and also would have been far cheaper. He concluded, "So... you actually care about people being healthier and not just feeling less depressed, is to end Medicaid and simply give people the monetary value of the program to purchase a private health plan."

In The Atlantic, Brian Fung wrote, "Obviously, simply 'feeling' healthier does not an argument for expanding Medicaid make. But the drop in depression diagnoses is a promising outcome given the condition's links to all manner of unpleasant health consequences. Taking greater steps to identify health problems before they happen has also been touted as a key requirement in keeping healthcare costs low over the long term. And improvements in financial security—including a 40 percent drop in the likelihood of having to take out a loan or leave other bills unpaid due to spending on healthcare—are a promising sign if the aim is to make healthcare more affordable."

Josh Barro wrote in Bloomberg View, "The financial effect is a big deal. Having Medicaid reduces your likelihood of facing medical expenses that exceed 30 percent of your income by 80 percent. This reflects that Medicaid is, in large part, a redistributive income-support program, which is desirable given persistently high unemployment and widening wage gaps." In an interview with Talking Points Memo, Jonathan Gruber, a co-author of the study and a professor of economics at the Massachusetts Institute of Technology, said, "I would view this study as somewhat weakening the argument for universal coverage based on health improvement and greatly strengthening the argument based on financial security and mental well being."

Ezra Klein wrote for Bloomberg that the "bottom line is that Medicaid worked" and called into question some of the technical particulars of the study. He quoted scholar Aaron Carroll of Indiana University’s School of Medicine that "if you look at the table in their study and look at baseline blood pressure it was like 119 over 76" and that "was normal. You wouldn’t expect it to go down by nine. It would be a bad thing for normal blood pressure to drop that much. All we should care about is blood pressure in the small subset that had high blood pressure. But they don’t present that." Writing for The Incidental Economist, Aaron Carroll and Austin Frakt, a health economist and researcher, argued that the study "shows that some things improved for people who got Medicaid. For others, changes weren't statistically significant, which isn't the same thing as certainty of no effect. For still others, the jury is still out. But it didn't show that Medicaid harms people, or that the ACA is a failure, or that anything supporters of Medicaid have said is a lie. Moreover, it certainly didn't show that private insurance or Medicare succeeds in ways that Medicaid fails." In The New York Times, Ross Douthat wrote that "health insurance is useful mostly because it averts financial catastrophe" and suggested that if financial security and economic mobility are goals, access to catastrophic health plans or to various tax credits should be expanded rather than access to Medicaid.

Richard Kronick of the United States Department of Health and Human Services and Andrew B. Bindman of the University of California, San Francisco wrote in The New England Journal of Medicine, "Insurance has three main purposes: to protect financial assets in the event of illness, to improve access to care, and to protect health... these results confirm the capacity of Medicaid to quickly and positively accomplish at least two of the three goals of insurance."

Roy Grant wrote in the American Journal of Public Health that conservative health policy wonks like Douthat "minimized or ignored" the major positive results of the OHIE, including "increased primary health care use, increased receipt of preventive health services including Papanicolaou tests and mammograms for women, increased diagnosis and treatment of diabetes, and increased diagnosis of depression." Grant also emphasized the finding that Medicaid was significantly associated with reduced medical debt and out-of-pocket spending.

== See also ==
- Health care in the United States
- Health care reform in the United States
- Oregon Health Plan
- Providence Portland Medical Center
- RAND health care experiment
