= Washington Examiner =

American conservative news outlet

- Front cover of Washington Examiner magazine for May 26, 2014
- Type: Website, weekly magazine
- Format: Internet, magazine
- Owner: MediaDC
- Founder: Philip Anschutz
- Editor-in-chief: Hugo Gurdon
- Founded: 2005; 21 years ago (newspaper) (as Montgomery Journal, Prince George's Journal, and Northern Virginia Journal); 2013 (magazine)
- Ceased publication: 2013 (newspaper)
- Political alignment: Conservative
- Language: English
- Headquarters: 1152 15th St. NW; Suite 200; Washington, D.C. 20005
- Circulation: 90,000 (as of 2021)
- ISSN: 2641-094X
- Website: washingtonexaminer.com

The Washington Examiner is an American conservative news magazine based in Washington, D.C., consisting of a website and a weekly printed magazine. It is owned by billionaire businessman Philip Anschutz through MediaDC, a subsidiary of Clarity Media Group.

From 2005 to 2013, the Examiner was published as a daily tabloid-sized newspaper, distributed throughout the Washington, D.C. metro area. The newspaper focused primarily on local news and political commentary. The local newspaper ceased publication in June 2013, whereupon its content began to focus almost exclusively on national politics from a conservative point of view. The Examiner switched its print edition from a daily newspaper to an expanded print weekly magazine format.

== History ==
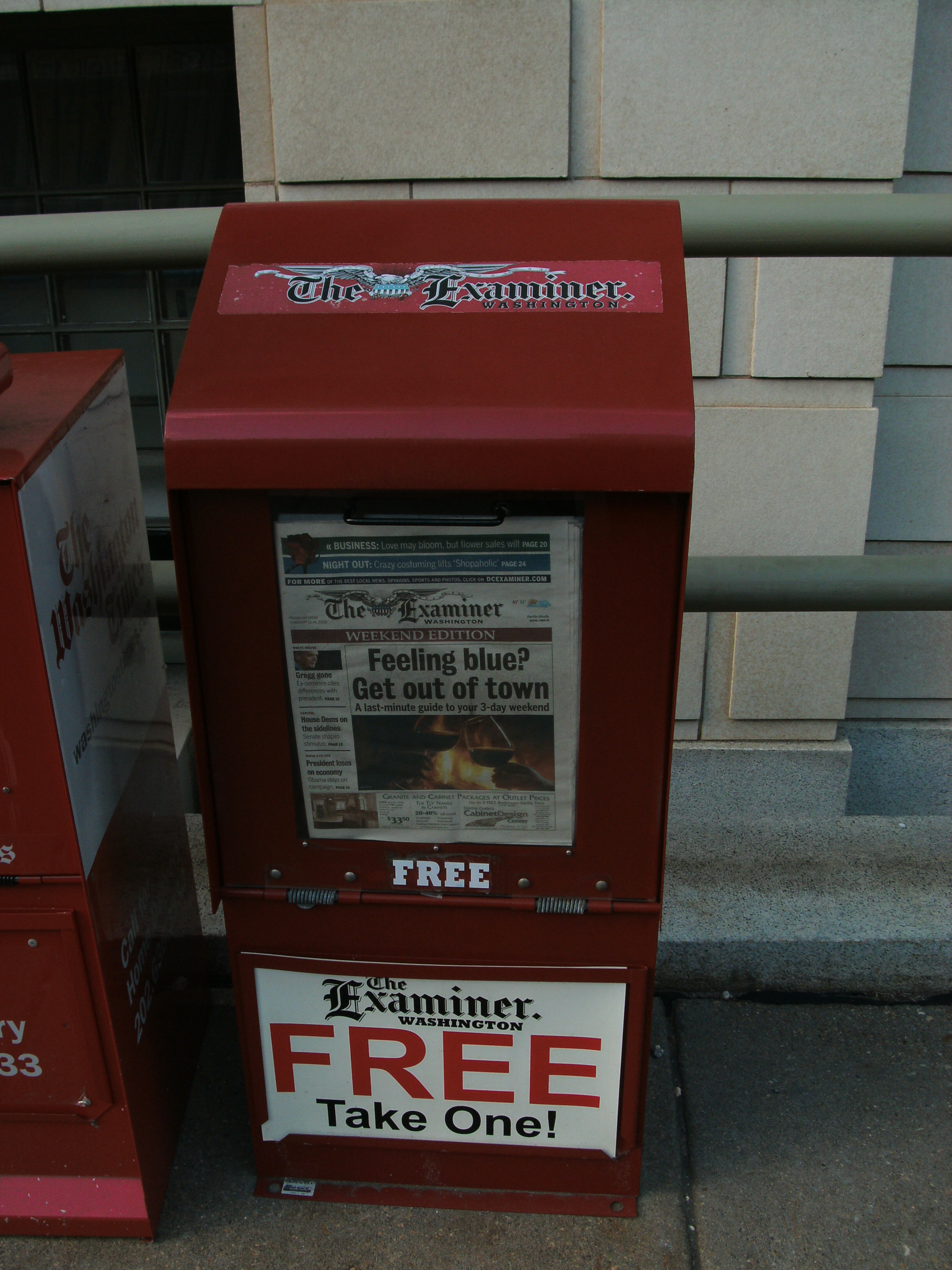
A Washington Examiner dispenser, from the time when the publication was a free daily newspaper

The publication now known as the Washington Examiner began its life as a handful of suburban news outlets known as the Journal Newspapers, distributed not in Washington D.C. itself, but only in its suburbs: Montgomery Journal, Prince George's Journal, Fairfax Journal, and Arlington Journal (later consolidated as the Northern Virginia Journal). Philip Anschutz purchased the parent company, Journal Newspapers Inc., in 2004. On February 1, 2005, the paper's name changed to the Washington Examiner, and it adopted a logo and format similar to those of another newspaper Anschutz then owned, San Francisco Examiner.

The Washington Examiner became increasingly influential in conservative political circles, hiring much of the talent from The Washington Times. The website DCist wrote in March 2013: "Despite the right-wing tilt of [the Examiner's] editorial pages and sensationalist front-page headlines, it also built a reputation as one of the best local sections in D.C." The newspaper's local coverage also gained attention, including a write-up by The New York Times, for contributing to the arrest of more than fifty fugitives through a feature that each week spotlighted a different person wanted by law enforcement agencies.

In March 2013, the company announced that it would stop printing a daily edition in June and refocus on national politics. The print edition was converted to a weekly magazine, while the website was continually updated. The new format was compared to that of The Hill. In December 2018, Clarity Media announced that the magazine would become a publicly available, expanded print magazine.

On January 27, 2020, Roy Moore filed a $40 million defamation lawsuit against the Washington Examiner. A former chief justice of the Alabama Supreme Court and candidate in the 2017 United States Senate special election in Alabama for the seat left open when Jeff Sessions joined the Trump administration, Moore claimed that the magazine repeatedly wrote "fake news" attacks stemming from allegations that he made unwanted sexual and romantic advances to girls as young as 15 when he was in his late 30s. An Alabama court dismissed most of Moore's claims in 2022 and a federal court dismissed Moore's appeal in 2024.

In January 2020, breaking news editor Jon Nicosia was fired after showing a sexually explicit video to colleagues. Nicosia denied any wrongdoing, saying he had only shared the video "because he thought it might go viral ... and become a news story". Nicosia accused managing editor Toby Harnden of abusive workplace behavior. An employee's complaint seen by CNN said that Harnden had created a "toxic work environment" and a climate of "workplace terror and bullying". Editor-in-chief Hugo Gurdon then announced Harnden had departed and that he was "enlisting a third-party to conduct a thorough investigation" into the Examiner. But CNN reported that "current and former Examiner employees" said that "Gurdon was aware of Harnden's brutish managing style" long before it became a public issue and did nothing about it.

In October 2020, the Examiner hired Greg Wilson as the new managing editor. As online editor of the Fox News website, Wilson had previously published a news story supporting the conspiracy theory about murdered Democratic aide Seth Rich and WikiLeaks.

In June 2020, the Examiner published an op-ed by "Raphael Badani", a fake persona who was part of a broader network pushing propaganda for the United Arab Emirates and against Qatar, Turkey, and Iran. The Daily Beast subsequently disclosed that Badani's "profile photos are stolen from the blog of an unwitting San Diego startup founder" while his "LinkedIn profile, which described him as a graduate of George Washington and Georgetown, is equally fictitious."

== Distribution and readership ==
In 2013, the magazine's publisher said it would seek to distribute the magazine to at least "45,000 government, public affairs, advocacy, academia and political professionals". The publisher also claimed the Examiner's readership is more likely to sign a petition, contact a politician, attend a political rally, or participate in a government advocacy group than those of Roll Call, Politico, or The Hill. Its publisher claims that the Examiner has a high-earning and highly educated audience, with 26 percent holding a master's or postgraduate degree and a large percentage earning over $500,000 annually, likely to be working in executive or senior management positions.

== Notable columnists and contributors ==
- Kristen Soltis Anderson
- Michael Barone
- John Bolton
- Tim Cavanaugh
- David Freddoso
- Quin Hillyer
- Timothy P. Carney
- Philip Klein
- Julie Mason
- Larry O'Connor
- Tara Palmeri
- Bill Sammon
- Geovanny Vicente
- Byron York

== Content and editorial stance ==
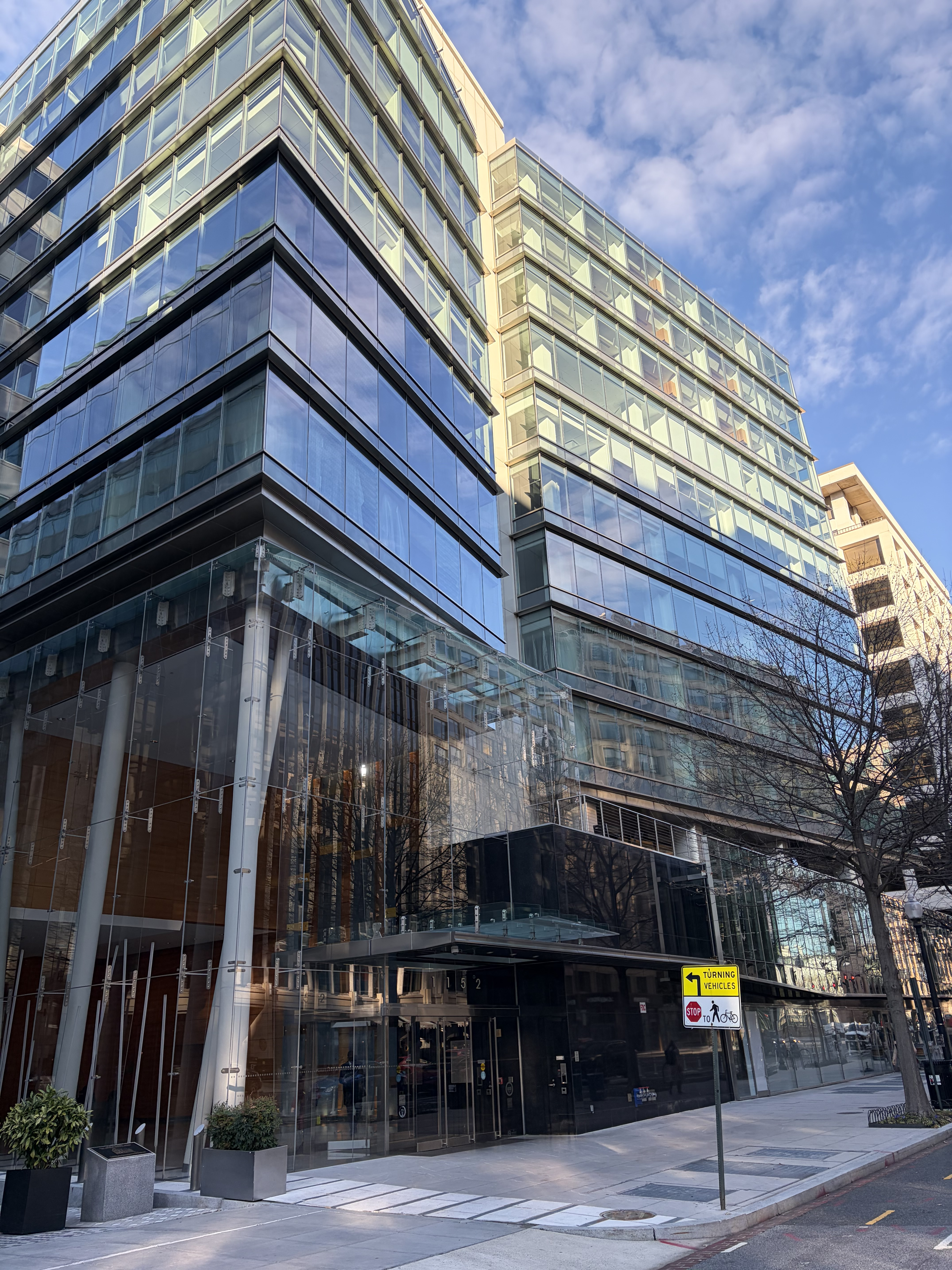
The Examiner's newsroom is located at 1152 15th Street NW in Washington.

The Examiner has been described as conservative. When Anschutz started it in its daily newspaper format, he envisioned creating a competitor to The Washington Post with a conservative editorial line. According to Politico: "When it came to the editorial page, Anschutz's instructions were explicit—he 'wanted nothing but conservative columns and conservative op-ed writers,' said one former employee."

According to the Columbia Journalism Review, among the conservative media landscape, the Examiner "is structured more or less like a mainstream newspaper—complete with clear distinctions between news reporting and commentary roles. The outlet has one of the largest newsrooms in online conservative media, with dedicated breaking news reporters and more specialized beat reporters, and a full editorial hierarchy." According to editor-in-chief Hugo Gurdon, the paper's conservatism on the news side was largely based on story selection, citing The Daily Telegraph as an inspiration.

The Examiner endorsed John McCain in the 2008 presidential election and Adrian Fenty in the 2010 Washington, D.C., mayoral election. On December 14, 2011, it endorsed Mitt Romney for the 2012 Republican presidential nomination, publishing an editorial saying he was the only Republican who could beat Barack Obama in the general election.

On the day after former Trump White House aide Cassidy Hutchinson testified before the House select committee on the January 6 attack in 2022, the Examiner published an editorial titled "Trump proven unfit for power again".

=== Anti-immigration stories ===
In January 2019, the Washington Examiner published a story with the headline "Border rancher: 'We've found prayer rugs out here. It's unreal'". Shortly thereafter, President Donald Trump cited the story as another justification for a border wall amid the 2018–19 federal government shutdown. The story in question cited one anonymous rancher who offered no evidence of prayer rugs. It did not say how the rancher knew the rugs in question were Muslim prayer rugs. The story's author formerly worked as press secretary for the anti-immigration group Federation for American Immigration Reform. Stories of Muslim prayer rugs at the border are urban myths that have been told since at least 2005, without evidence.

In April 2019, Quartz reported that White House advisor Stephen Miller had been purposely leaking information on border apprehensions and asylum seekers to the Examiner so that the paper would publish stories with alarming statistics that sometimes criticized DHS secretary Kirstjen Nielsen, which he could then show to Trump to undermine her. Nielsen was fired in April 2019, reportedly for being insufficiently hawkish on immigration.

=== Climate change ===
The Washington Examiner has published opinion pieces that oppose or deny the scientific consensus on climate change. In February 2010, it published an op-ed in which Michael Barone, a pundit who writes frequently promoting skepticism of climate science, called data from the East Anglia Climatic Research Unit and parts of an IPCC report "propaganda that was based on such shoddy and dishonest evidence". Daniel Sarewitz of Arizona State University criticized Barone, writing that Barone and other conservative climate change pundits erroneously "portrayed deviation from scientific certainty and highly idealized notions of 'the scientific method' as evidence against climate change", which he compared to "equally naïve and idealized" presentations on the other side of the debate, such as the film An Inconvenient Truth.

In 2017, the Washington Examiner editorial board supported Trump's unilateral withdrawal from the Paris Climate Accords, which the Examiner editorial board called "a big flashy set of empty promises... The Earth's climate is changing, as it always has. And part of the reason it is changing is due to human activity. But those two facts are excuses neither for alarmism and reflexive, but ineffective action, nor for sacrificing sovereignty to give politicians a short-term buzz of fake virtue and green guerrillas another weapon with which to ambush democratic policymaking."

On August 31, 2019, the Washington Examiner published an op-ed column by Patrick Michaels and Caleb Stewart Rossiter titled "The Great Failure of the Climate Models". It claimed that generally accepted climate models were not valid scientific tools. Some scientists called the op-ed highly misleading, saying it contained numerous false assertions and cherry-picked data.

In July 2025, the Washington Examiner published an op-ed column by Environmental Protection Agency Administrator Lee Zeldin arguing in favor of "American energy dominance" and criticizing the Biden administration for "irresponsibly" abandoning energy sources such as coal, petroleum, natural gas, nuclear, and hydropower.
