= Philip Klein (editor) =

American journalist and author

- Education: George Washington University (BA); Columbia University (MA)
- Occupations: Journalist, author
- Employer: National Review
- Political party: Republican (before 2016); Independent (2016–present)

Philip Klein is an American author and journalist who is the editor of National Review Online. Klein previously worked as the executive editor of the Washington Examiner, as a Washington correspondent for The American Spectator, and as a financial reporter for Reuters. He became editor of the conservative publication National Review Online in March 2021.

== Early life and education ==
Born Jewish, Klein grew up in New York City. He graduated from George Washington University with degrees in history and economics and has a master's degree in journalism from the Columbia University Graduate School of Journalism.

== Career ==
=== Journalism ===
Klein is a former Reuters reporter. He worked for the American Spectator before joining the Washington Examiner in 2011. In 2014, he became the commentary editor of the same paper. In 2015, Klein was promoted to managing editor of the paper, and in 2018, he was named executive editor.

In September 2012, while Florida Congresswoman Debbie Wasserman Schultz was chair of the Democratic National Committee, Schultz accused Klein of "deliberately misquoting" her. In a fact check prompted by Klein's release of the audio, The Washington Post concluded that "Klein's quote was exactly accurate, meaning Wasserman Schultz falsely accused the Examiner of misquoting her."

In 2018, Klein reported on a tweet by Representative Alexandria Ocasio-Cortez about Department of Defense budgets which he called a "$21 trillion mistake" revealing a lack of understanding of government budgeting.

=== Authorship ===
Klein's 2019 book, Fear Your Future: How the Deck Is Stacked Against Millennials and Why Socialism Would Make It Worse, released by Templeton Press in October 2019, was discussed on C-SPAN in November 2019. The book includes essays by other writers including David Harsanyi and Ramesh Ponnuru.

Klein's 2015 book, Overcoming Obamacare: Three Approaches to Reversing the Government Takeover of Health Care, laid out the policy approaches available to the bill's opponents.

== Politics ==
In 2016, Klein left the Republican Party in protest over the nomination of Donald Trump, tweeting out his announcement and the completed voter registration form on 3 May 2016.

== Works ==
- Philip Klein (October 2019). Fear Your Future: How the Deck is Stacked Against Millennials and Why Socialism Would Make it Worse. Templeton Press. ISBN 978-1599475738.
- Philip Klein (January 2015). Overcoming Obamacare: Three Approaches to Reversing the Government Takeover of Health Care. Washington Examiner. ISBN 978-0692361702.
- Philip Klein (May 2012). Conservative Survival in the Romney Era (e-book). Philip Andrew Klein. ASIN B0084PTQUS.
