= Individual shared responsibility provision =

American health insurance tax mandate

The individual shared responsibility provision, less formally known as the individual mandate, was the health insurance mandate imposed on individuals by the Affordable Care Act in the United States until tax year 2019. This individual mandate required most individuals and their families to have a certain minimal amount of health insurance, with certain exemptions. Otherwise, they were required to pay the individual shared responsibility payment as a fine. It was one of the many Affordable Care Act tax provisions. The federal tax penalty for violating the mandate was effectively eliminated by the Tax Cuts and Jobs Act of 2017, starting in 2019. In order to pass the Senate under reconciliation rules with only 50 votes, the requirement itself is still legally in effect, however, the fine was set to $0.

== Summary ==
Starting January 2014, individuals and their families must have at least minimum essential coverage. Individuals may be exempt from health insurance coverage in some cases:

- The minimum amount that they must pay for annual premiums is more than eight percent of their household income.
- They have a gap in coverage for less than three consecutive months.
- They belong to a group explicitly exempted from participating.
- They qualify for an exemption for one of several other reasons, such as a hardship that prevents them from obtaining coverage.

Individuals and their families who have no health insurance, are required to make the shared responsibility payment.

== History ==
The Patient Protection and Affordable Care Act signed in 2010 imposed a health insurance mandate to take effect in 2014. On June 28, 2012, the Supreme Court of the United States upheld the health insurance mandate as a valid tax within Congress's taxing power in the case National Federation of Independent Business v. Sebelius.

The federal tax penalty for violating the mandate was zeroed out by the Tax Cuts and Jobs Act of 2017, starting in 2019. This raised questions about whether the Affordable Care Act was still constitutional, but in California v. Texas, the Supreme Court ruled that plaintiffs who had challenged the law on this basis lacked standing to sue.

== Minimum essential coverage ==
Whether health care coverage qualifies as minimum essential coverage depends largely on the type of coverage it is. Most coverage that people have is considered to be minimum essential coverage. However, coverage providing only limited benefits does not qualify as minimum essential coverage.

The following table mentions some of the more common health care coverage situations and whether or not they qualify as minimum essential coverage.
Coverage type	Examples	Qualifies as minimum essential coverage?
Employer-sponsored coverage	Group health insurance coverage for employees under a governmental plan, such as the Federal Employees Health Benefit program; A self-insured group health plan for employees; Retiree coverage	Yes
Individual health coverage	Health insurance purchased directly from an insurance company; Health insurance purchased through the health insurance marketplace; Health insurance provided through a student health plan	Yes
Coverage under government-sponsored programs	Medicare Part A coverage; Medicare Advantage plans; Most Medicaid coverage; Coverage through a Basic Health Program (BHP) standard health plan	Yes
Coverage that provides limited benefits	Coverage consisting solely of excepted benefits, such as stand-alone dental, vision, accident, or disability insurance; Medicaid providing only a single service, for example, providing only family planning services; Some TRICARE coverage	No

== Coverage exemption ==
If individuals or anyone in their families claim an exemption from minimum essential coverage, individuals are not required to make a shared responsibility payment. If individuals have a gross income below the tax return filing threshold for a certain year, they are automatically exempt from the shared responsibility provision for that year.

Most exemptions are claimed using Form 8965, Health Coverage Exemptions, when a tax return is filed. However, certain exemptions must be granted by the health insurance marketplace in advance, like coverage exemptions for certain hardship situations and for members of certain religious sects.

The following table shows some types of exemptions available and indicates whether the exemption is granted by the marketplace, claimed on a tax return, or both.
Exemptions	Granted by marketplace, claimed on tax return, or either
Coverage is considered unaffordable	Tax return
Income below the return filing threshold	Tax return
Citizens living abroad	Tax return
Nonresidents	Tax return
Member of Indian tribe	Either
Member of certain religious sects	Marketplace
General hardship	Marketplace
Resident of a state that did not expand Medicaid	Either

== Shared responsibility payment (eliminated as of tax year 2019) ==
Individuals without minimum essential coverage were required to make the shared responsibility payment until the end of tax year 2018, unless they qualified for exemptions. When the Tax Cuts and Jobs Act went into effect in 2018, it eliminated this tax penalty as of tax year 2019. The worksheets located in the instructions to Form 8965, Health Coverage Exemptions, could be used to figure the shared responsibility payment amount that was due while still in effect. The annual payment amount was a percentage of the household income in excess of the return filing threshold or a flat dollar amount, whichever was greater.

== See also ==
- Affordable Care Act tax provisions
- Form 1095
- Health insurance mandate
- Individual mandate
- Patient Protection and Affordable Care Act
