= Small Business Health Options Program =

The federal Small Business Health Options Program is an insurance exchange created by the Patient Protection and Affordable Care Act (Obamacare). The Small Business Health Options Program (SHOP) Marketplace helps small businesses provide health coverage to their employees. It is open to employers with 50 or fewer full-time equivalent employees (FTEs), which also includes non-profit organizations.

According to the HealthCare.gov, the benefit of SHOP Marketplace includes allowing owners to offer health and dental coverage to employees. Other than that, with flexibility, choice, and the online application and account management, SHOP aims to meets the needs of the business owner and its employees.

In 2015, Employee Choice was introduced under the PPACA's Small Business Health Options Program (SHOP) Marketplace. While SHOP was available for 2014, this is the first year that small employers in 14 states can apply online. Before 2015, employers who provided health insurance to their employees typically worked with an insurance broker and one health insurance company. In 2015, they can, however, offer their employees a choice of insurance companies.

SHOP enrollment is available any time of the year - there is no "Open Enrollment" limitation. Employers who wish to contribute to the premium cost of their employees may qualify to receive a SHOP tax credit. The tax credit is worth up to 50% of employer's contribution toward its employees' premium costs. It will be up to 35% for tax-exempt employers. Unfortunately, employees can't join the plan after the initial enrollment period unless they are new hires and qualify Special Enrollment Period.

According to the HealthCare.gov, special Enrollment Period refers to a time outside of the open enrollment period, in which you and your family have a right to sign up for health coverage. In other words, you qualify for a special enrollment period 60 days following certain life events, including but limited to: change in family status such as marriage or birth of a child, change in income or address, or loss of other health coverage through unemployment or divorce.

However, the SHOP Marketplace is not offered to self-employed individuals with no employees. Instead, they are essentially in the same position as unemployed persons who must turn to the Health Insurance Marketplace for coverage.

As of March 13, 2015, the United States Department of Health and Human Services claims, evidence has shown that the SHOP marketplace is working in terms of affordability. Taxpayers are benefiting as health costs and spending decreased last year. With a historic slowdown in the growth of health care costs, workers, businesses and taxpayers are able to generate savings under the introduction of SHOP.

== Tax credit ==
The Small Business Health Care tax credit is available to small employers who pay health insurance premiums on behalf of employees enrolled in a qualified health plan through a SHOP Marketplace. Employers who purchase health insurance through the program may get a tax credit of up to 50% of their premium contributions. The tax credit via Form 8941 is available only to businesses that meet certain standards. Firstly, employers have fewer than 25 employees. Secondly, their employee salary must be less than an average of $50,000. Thirdly, employer must pay at least 50% of the full-time employee's premium costs. However, employers are not required to offer coverage to part-time employees (work fewer than 30 works/week) or dependents, or to seasonal workers who aren't considered full-time employees unless they work more than 120 days during the tax year. Lastly, the coverage to those full-employment must be offered through SHOP Marketplace.

There are employees who are excluded from this arrangement, such as partners or owners of more than 5% of the business and family members.

After 2014, small business owners can only claim the credit for two consecutive years in a row. After this they are no longer eligible to claim this credit.

Employers should apply to receive this tax credit on the annual business tax return. The tax credit is highest in particularly for small companies with fewer than 10 employees, with an average annual salary of $25,000 or less.

For instance, if there are 10 employees with total wage of $250,000, employer will receive a tax credit amount of $35,000 as they contribute at least $70,000 to their premiums.
