= California v. Texas =

California v. Texas Texas v. California
- Supreme Court of the United States

Argued November 10, 2020 Decided June 17, 2021
- Full case name: California, et al. v. Texas, et al.; Texas, et al. v. California, et al.
- Docket nos.: 19-840; 19-1019
- Citations: 593 U.S. 659 (more)

Case history
- Prior: Summary judgment granted, Texas v. United States, 340 F. Supp. 3d 579 (N.D. Tex. 2018); Stay granted, 352 F. Supp. 3d 665 (N.D. Tex. 2018); Affirmed in part, vacated in part, and remanded, 945 F.3d 355 (5th Cir. 2019); Cert. granted, 140 S. Ct. 1262 (2020)

Holding
- Plaintiffs do not have standing to challenge §5000A(a)'s minimum essential coverage provision because they have not shown a past or future injury fairly traceable to defendants' conduct enforcing the specific statutory provision they attack as unconstitutional.

Court membership
- Chief Justice John Roberts Associate Justices Clarence Thomas · Stephen Breyer; Samuel Alito · Sonia Sotomayor; Elena Kagan · Neil Gorsuch; Brett Kavanaugh · Amy Coney Barrett

Case opinions
- Majority: Breyer, joined by Roberts, Thomas, Sotomayor, Kagan, Kavanaugh, Barrett
- Concurrence: Thomas
- Dissent: Alito, joined by Gorsuch

Laws applied
- Case or Controversy Clause, U.S. Const. Art. III, Affordable Care Act, Tax Cuts and Jobs Act

California v. Texas, 593 U.S. 659 (2021), was a United States Supreme Court case that dealt with the constitutionality of the 2010 Affordable Care Act (ACA), colloquially known as Obamacare. It was the third such challenge to the ACA seen by the Supreme Court since its enactment. The case in California followed after the enactment of the Tax Cuts and Jobs Act of 2017 and the change to the tax penalty amount for Americans without required insurance that reduced the "individual mandate" (26 U.S.C. § 5000A) to zero, effective for months after December 31, 2018. The District Court of the Northern District of Texas concluded that this individual mandate was a critical provision of the ACA and that, with a penalty amount equal to zero, some or all of the ACA was potentially unconstitutional as an improper use of Congress's taxation powers.

Under the Donald Trump administration, the federal government had declined to challenge the lower court ruling, leading California and several other states to intervene and appeal the ruling, which the Fifth Circuit Court of Appeals granted. The Court of Appeals for the Fifth Circuit upheld the ruling that the individual mandate was unconstitutional, but determined that the mandate might be severable from the rest of the ACA. Both California and Texas petitioned review of the Fifth's decision to the Supreme Court; the Court consolidated both California v. Texas and Texas v. California under the same case.

In a 7–2 decision issued on June 17, 2021, the Supreme Court ruled that Texas and other states that initially challenged the individual mandate did not have standing, as they had not shown past or future injury related to the provision. The Supreme Court otherwise did not rule on the constitutionality of the individual mandate in this case.

== Background ==
The ACA (Obamacare) was passed in 2010 under Democratic leadership in both houses of Congress and signed by President Barack Obama. Among much of its provisions, it provided programs for states to provide free or low-cost health insurance to low-income residents through programs like Medicare and Medicaid. ACA encouraged all Americans to have health insurance and as part of this, created an income tax penalty for those that did not have health insurance, otherwise known as the "individual mandate". Passage of the ACA was controversial, and remained an issue that was divided along political lines, with Democrats seeing the law as promoting the public good and Republicans seeing it as a tax burden. The law had been challenged in courts multiple times, with the Supreme Court having seen two cases previously. In 2012, the Court ruled 5–4 in National Federation of Independent Business v. Sebelius that the individual mandate was constitutional as a granted power of Congress under the Taxing and Spending Clause.

In 2016, the Republican Party held control of both the House and Senate and gained control of the Executive branch with the election of President Donald Trump. Trump had campaigned on the promise of replacing the ACA once in office, and repealing the law was one of the early targets of the Republicans, but early efforts failed by mid 2017 due to in-party disputes, specifically the deciding vote which was to come from Senator John McCain who denied the Republican Party due to the fact that a promised replacement plan was not forthcoming.

== Case history ==
=== Tax Cuts and Jobs Act of 2017 ===
By December 2017, President Trump signed into law a large tax relief bill, the Tax Cuts and Jobs Act of 2017. Among many other tax cuts, the Act eliminated the individual mandate requirement from the ACA by reducing penalty amount related to the required amount of health coverage to US$0 starting in 2019. The elimination of the penalty was estimated by the Congressional Budget Office to save more than US$300 billion in federal spending, although it would cause premium rates to go up for some individual taxpayers. Political commentators recognized that the removal of the individual mandate penalty was a partial victory for the Republicans who were trying to repeal the ACA.

=== District Court ===
In February 2018, Texas led 19 other states in a federal lawsuit in the United States District Court for the Northern District of Texas challenging the constitutionality of the ACA following the removal of the individual mandate from the Internal Revenue Code. The plaintiffs in the suit, Texas v. Azar, argued that since the penalty related to the individual mandate was seen as core provision of the ACA as determined by the Supreme Court in Sebelius, its removal should make the entire law an unconstitutional exercise of Congressional taxing power. The United States Department of Justice told the district court in June 2018 that it mostly agreed with the general basis of the lawsuit, in that without the individual mandate, certain provisions of the ACA were invalidated such as the protections it had provided for those with pre-existing conditions, and would not defend those factors in court. However, the Justice Department still believed certain provisions of the ACA were valid.

On December 14, 2018, District Judge Reed O'Connor released his opinion on the case, affirming that without the individual mandate, the whole of the ACA was unconstitutional, going farther than the Justice Department had even indicated. O'Connor wrote that the "Individual Mandate can no longer be fairly read as an exercise of Congress's Tax Power and is still impermissible under the Interstate Commerce Clause—meaning the Individual Mandate is unconstitutional." He then further reasoned that the individual mandate is an essential part of the entire law, and thus was not severable, making the entire law unconstitutional. O'Connor's decision rendered the ACA unconstitutional but did not immediately overturn the law, granting a stay pending the resolution of the case on appeal. Among reaction to this decision was California and several other states, vowing to lead a challenge to the ruling.

=== Fifth Circuit ===
By early January 2019, 17 states led by California filed an appeal of O'Connor's decision to the Fifth Circuit, as the Justice Department had indicated it would not challenge the ruling. At this point, it was recognized that the case was likely bound for the Supreme Court, and would land in the midst of the 2020 elections, making it a critical issue for either party. Four additional states joined California's challenge by February 2019, bringing the number to 21. The Democrat-controlled House of Representatives following the 2018 election also joined in the defense. The Department of Justice filed a brief in support of the defendants (Texas et al.) in March 2019, now in full agreement with O'Connor's decision that the ACA as a whole was unconstitutional without the individual mandate, and would support Texas in defending the challenge. Briefs were also filed by the Association of American Physicians and Surgeons, American Center for Law and Justice, Foundation for Moral Law, and Citizens United.

Prior to the July 2019 oral hearings, the judges in the Fifth Circuit raised the question of whether California and the other states had standing to bring the challenge to the original suit. The oral hearings before Judges Carolyn Dineen King, Jennifer Walker Elrod, and Kurt Engelhardt focused on the constitutional challenge, the intent of Congress when they wrote and passed the Tax Cuts and Jobs Act, and on the matter of standing. Observers believed the case would be decided upholding O'Connor's ruling due to how the questioning fell, with Judges Elrod and Engelhardt, both appointed under Republican presidents, asking the bulk of the questions, while Senior Judge King, appointed under Democrat Jimmy Carter, was relatively silent.

The Fifth Circuit issued its ruling on December 18, 2019. The 2–1 decision, joined by Judges Elrod and Engelhardt, upheld in principle District Judge O'Connor's decision that with the elimination of the individual mandate, parts of the ACA were potentially unconstitutional. However, the decision remanded the case back to the district court, arguing that O'Connor's conclusion that the whole of the ACA was unconstitutional may be flawed. The Fifth Circuit decision asked the District Court to consider the concept of severability, since the individual mandate aspect was not apparently tied to other parts of the ACA like the health insurance marketplace. The Fifth Circuit also asked the District Court to consider a suggestion that the Justice Department had included in one of its briefs where the ACA may be invalid only in those states that had challenged it. As questions remained to the degree to which the ACA was unconstitutional, the ACA remained in enforcement following the decision.

== Supreme Court ==
Map of states involved after cases were consolidated Petitioners Respondents

The California-led group filed a petition for writ of certiorari to the Supreme Court by January 3, 2020, in response to the Fifth Circuit's decision. The filing asked for the case to be heard on an expedited schedule, "because of the practical importance of the questions presented for review and the pressing need for their swift resolution by this Court". Texas and the other states also filed a petition in February 2020 for the Supreme Court, asking them to deny the expedited review of the case as it was not ripe and allow it to proceed through the normal judicial process, but that should it accept the case, to review and affirm the ruling that the ACA is now unconstitutional.

On June 25, the Trump administration's Solicitor General of the United States, Noel J. Francisco, filed a brief arguing that the individual mandate is unconstitutional and that, because of this, the rest of the law must be struck down, too.

The Supreme Court refused to hear the case on an expedited schedule for the 2019–2020 term, but did agree, on March 2, 2020, to hear the case during the 2020–2021 term, reviewing not only the severability factors but the standing issue raised by the Fifth Circuit. The Court consolidated both California's and Texas's petitions (Dockets 19-840 and 19–1019, respectively) under California v. Texas.

Oral arguments were heard on November 10, 2020. Observers to the arguments believed that Chief Justice John Roberts and Justice Brett Kavanaugh, along with the three more liberal Justices, appeared to accept the severability arguments of the individual mandate that would leave the rest of the ACA in place.

After Democrats won control of Congress through the 2020 elections (and associated runoffs in 2021), speculation arose that the Democratic-controlled Congress would follow President Joe Biden's desire to reinstate the individual mandate. This would effectively nullify any ruling against Obamacare, as the case is predicated upon a $0 individual mandate penalty. The Department of Justice under Biden did submit a new amicus brief in February 2021 following the oral hearings asserting that they now believe the ACA is constitutional and the mandate is severable from the rest of the ACA.

=== Decision ===
The Court issued its decision on June 17, 2021. In a 7–2 ruling, the Court reversed the Fifth Circuit's ruling and remanded the case for further review. In the majority opinion written by Justice Stephen Breyer and joined by Chief Justice John Roberts and Justices Clarence Thomas, Sonia Sotomayor, Elena Kagan, Brett Kavanaugh, and Amy Coney Barrett, the Supreme Court concluded that Texas and other plaintiff states did not have standing to bring the initial challenge of the individual mandate, as those states could not show a past or future injury related to the mandate provision. The Court's decision did not address the constitutionality question of the individual mandate. Breyer wrote in the majority opinion that Texas and the other plaintiff states had failed to show standing as "Unsurprisingly, the states have not demonstrated that an unenforceable mandate will cause their residents to enroll in valuable benefits programs that they would otherwise forgo".

Justice Thomas also wrote a concurring opinion. While Thomas agreed with the dissenting opinion that the Court had erred in how it handled the ACA in the past, he wrote that the decision in California was correct as Texas and the other states did not show any injury pending from the individual mandate.

Justice Samuel Alito wrote the dissenting opinion, joined by Justice Neil Gorsuch. Alito stated that the individual mandate was "clearly unconstitutional" and criticized the majority opinion for "judicial inventiveness".

== Reactions ==
Legal experts believed that the decision based on lack of standing would make it difficult for any other party to challenge the ACA further. Law professor Steve Vladeck said that by avoiding the constitutional question of the individual mandate and instead deciding on standing, the Supreme Court "made it much harder for anyone to get that issue into the courts going forward. In essence, they sucked the oxygen out of the ACA's continuing constitutional fire."

President Joe Biden in a statement called the ruling "a major victory for all Americans," affirming that "healthcare is a right and not a privilege" and that "it is time move forward and keep building on this landmark law." HHS Secretary Xavier Becerra stated that "[the] decision means that all Americans continue to have a right to access affordable care, free of discrimination." Barack Obama stated that "The principle of universal coverage has been established," and that the law "is here to stay." House Speaker Nancy Pelosi and Senate Majority Leader Chuck Schumer also heralded the ruling, with Schumer stating "For more than a decade, the assault on our health care law was relentless from Republicans in Congress, from the executive branch itself and from Republican attorneys general in the courts."

Texas attorney general Ken Paxton, whose office brought one of the original lawsuits leading to the Supreme Court appeal, said that he will continue to seek legal means to challenge the ACA. "If the government is allowed to mislead its citizens, pass a massive government takeover of healthcare, and yet still survive after Supreme Court review, this spells doom for the principles of Federalism and limited government." Republicans such as Sen. John Barrasso criticized the decision and the ACA, suggesting that Republicans would focus on policymaking. In a joint statement, Reps. Kevin McCarthy, Steve Scalise and Elise Stefanik criticized the ACA and called on Congress to improve healthcare.
