= Sassona Norton =

Israeli-American sculptor (born 1942)

- ששונה נורטון
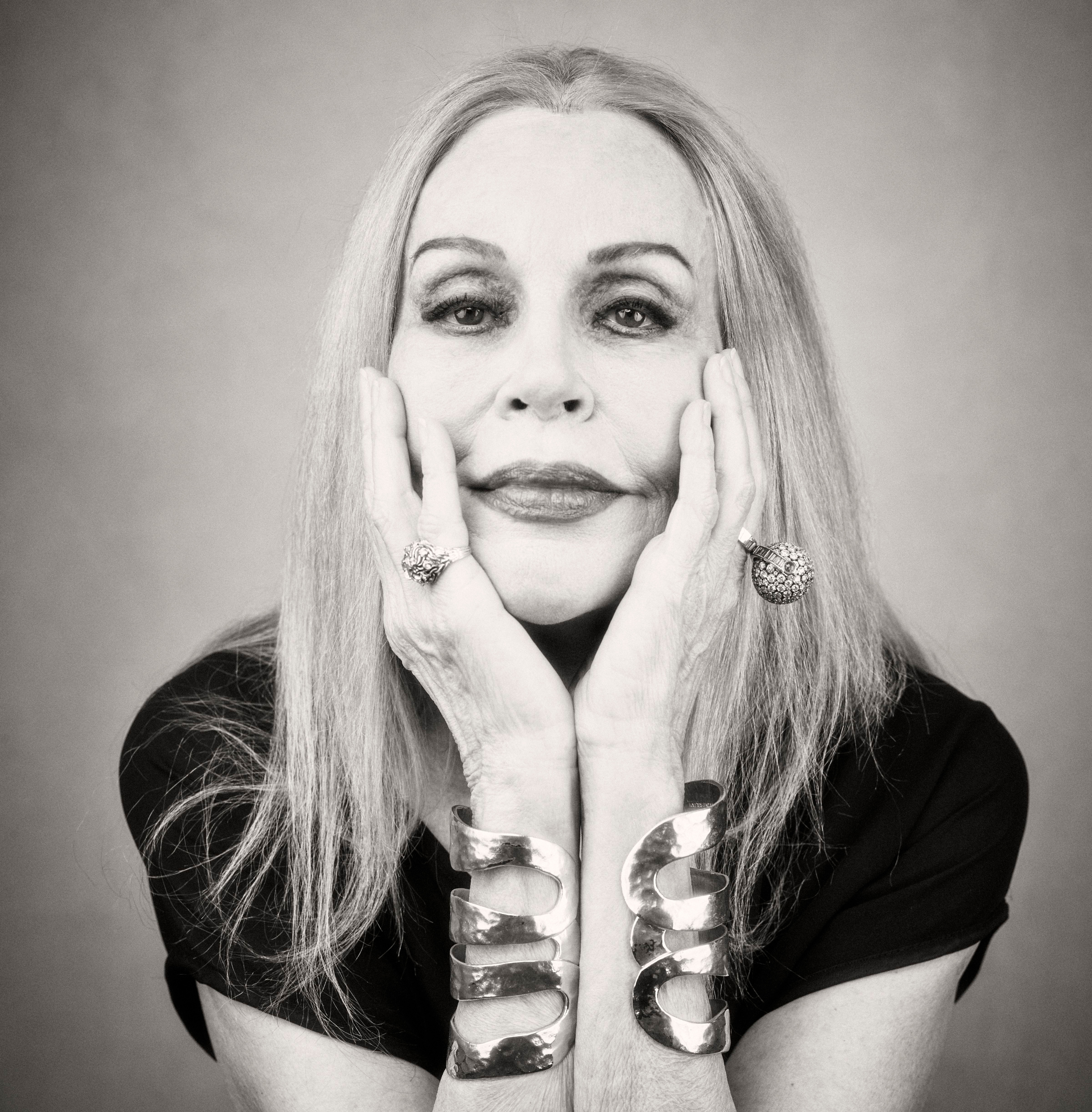
- Sassona Norton (2020). Photo by Christian Oth
- Born: February 26, 1942 (age 84); Israel
- Education: Tel Aviv University
- Occupation: Artist
- Spouses: Reed Whittle (1942 - 2008; his death); Ron Filler (m. 2020)
- Website: www.sassonanorton-sculpture.com

Sassona Norton PPRBS (Hebrew: ששונה נורטון; born 26 February 1942) is an Israeli-born American sculptor.

== Early life ==
Norton was born and raised in Israel. She graduated from Tel Aviv University with a degree in Literature and Theatre. She went on to teach literature in high school, directed and produced theatrical events and wrote about film, theater and art for Yediot Achronot, one of Israel largest newspapers. Norton painted from her early age and took it on seriously in her late teens, when she studied privately with several well-known Israeli painters. In her mid-twenties, after showing at several group shows, Norton had a first solo of her large scale paintings of abstracted figures at Gallery 220 in Tel Aviv. The show was praised by the Jerusalem Post for creating “3-D spaces populated with tension and lyricism”. Norton immigrated to the United States in 1974 and joined the Art Students League of New York, where she was awarded the Isabel Bishop Merit Scholarship.

== Career ==
Norton began to achieve artistic success in the early 1980s, first with the publication of her work A Yellow Night, in Twentieth Century Masters of Erotic Art by Crown Publishers, alongside works by Picasso, Rodin, Calder, and Dali. In 1981, she was chosen for Eight Young New Yorkers on the Horizon. In 1983, her large-scale painting The Rain Prayer was published in the Discover Art series by Laura H. Chapman. In 1984, Norton's solo show at Sutton Gallery in New York City was praised by the critic Peter Fingesten for its "vision and strength".

In 1999 Norton shifted from painting to sculpting after working in architectural and design installation projects. She was awarded the Huntington Merit Medal for her sculpture The Edge of Rest at the National Arts Club in New York in 2002. In 2003 she sculpted the largest September 11th Memorial in Pennsylvania, costing $200,000. The memorial, close to twenty-feet tall, was installed in Norristown in 2005. In 2006, the Morris Museum in New Jersey held a major show of her sculptures, which was extended by popular demand for over six months. In connection with the show, the museum published Sassona Norton Sculpture. The hard-cover book included essays by Steve Miller, the Museum Director, Hilarie Sheets of the New York Times and Ann Landi of Artnews. In 2008, "A Memorial Journey", the documentary about the making of the 9/11 Memorial, was shown at the International Art Fair in Stockholm.

In 2011, the Ljungqvist Foundation for anti-doping in Sweden selected Norton out of eight sculptors in Europe and the U.S. to create a monument for anti-doping in sport. The monument is planned as an edition of twenty for major cities around the world. In 2016, Norton created a series of 20 large posters depicting a bronze hand in a gesture of winning with a gold ring on the index tip to indicate purity rising. The posters raised the hand on different sculpted bases.

In 2016 Norton was invited to show her sculpture, An Hour Before Dawn, at the Workhouse Arts Center, AKA The Prison Museum, in Lorton, Virginia. The sculpture was chosen as an icon for the Suffragists' Centennial to commemorate their imprisonment and torture during the Night of Terror at the former Lorton Reformatory.

In 2017 Norton accepted the invitation to serve as a Trustee on the Board of the Morris Museum in Morristown NJ.

In 2019, Norton's sculpture “An Hour Before Dawn”, purchased by Craig Ponzio of Colorado in 2006, was selected as the face of the upcoming show of his signature collection at the Denver Botanic Gardens in Denver, Colorado. In addition to Sassona Norton, the exhibition included sculptures by Auguste Rodin, Jacques Lipchitz, Beverly Pepper, Rufino Tamayo, Manolo Valdés and Eric Fischl. The show, "Human | Nature: Figures from the Craig Ponzio Sculpture Collection", ran from April 19 to September 15, 2019.

Sculpting the monument of anti-doping in sport, titled Et Purus, started in 2019. Et Purus No. 1, the first in the edition of 20, raised the large hand on a truncated globe. Designated for Monaco, it was installed in December 2021 on Jeteé Lucciana, which juts into the Mediterranean and borders the famous Monaco Yacht Harbor. The unveiling was hosted by Albert II, Prince of Monaco in December of that year in the presence of international sports dignitaries and the media. In 2023, Et Purus No. 2, which raises the same hand sculpture on a frustum, was selected to be installed on Djurgården, the Royal Island in the center of Stockholm. The unveiling, due for September 2024, will be attended by His Majesty, Carl XVI Gustaf, King of Sweden and Her Majesty, Sylvia. His Majesty the King will conduct the unveiling. The regal unveiling empowers the new international campaign movement for anti-doping and a drug-free society through the creation of monuments.

Norton is a member of the Royal Society of Sculptors, the National Sculpture Society, the International Sculpture Center, the Washington Sculptors Group and the Sculptors Guild, where she served on the Board.

=== Collections ===
- Henry Buhl, New York
- Ivan Greenstein, New Jersey
- Wu Han and David Finckel, artistic directors of the Chamber Music Society of Lincoln Center, New York
- The Ambassador Swanee Hunt, Massachusetts
- Lee Longell, New Jersey
- Peter Migliorato, Florida
- Sally Minard & Norton Garfinkle, New York
- Harry & Lynn O'Mealia, Maryland
- Elizabeth Palay & Ed Feige, Wisconsin
- Craig Ponzio, "Art Investments", Colorado
- Mike McKool, McKool Smith, chairman, Texas
- Morris Museum, New Jersey
- Haya Horowitz, Israel
- Dr.and Mrs. Moshe Shike, New York
- Nathan and Karen Shike, London

== Personal life ==
Norton was married to Dr. Reed Whittle, a psychotherapist and international management consultant to leaders of Fortune 500 companies, until he died on August 12, 2008, from complications related to Sweet's syndrome. In 2020, Norton married Dr. Ron Filler, the founder of Drug Development Consultants. She owns an estate in Bedminster, New Jersey and also an apartment on the Upper East Side of Manhattan.

== Philanthropy ==
Norton and Filler are patrons of the National Museum of Women in the Arts, the Museum of Modern Art, the Newark Museum, The Discovery Orchestra, the Morris Museum and the Chamber Music Society of Lincoln Center in New York, where Norton has served on the Global Council since 2018.

Norton is a registered Democrat and has contributed financially to Coalition for Progress and Hillary For America. In 2016 she donated over $12,700 to the Democratic Party.
