= Ol Pejeta Conservancy =

Not-for-profit wildlife conservancy in Central Kenya's Laikipia County

Coordinates: 0.00°N 37.00°E

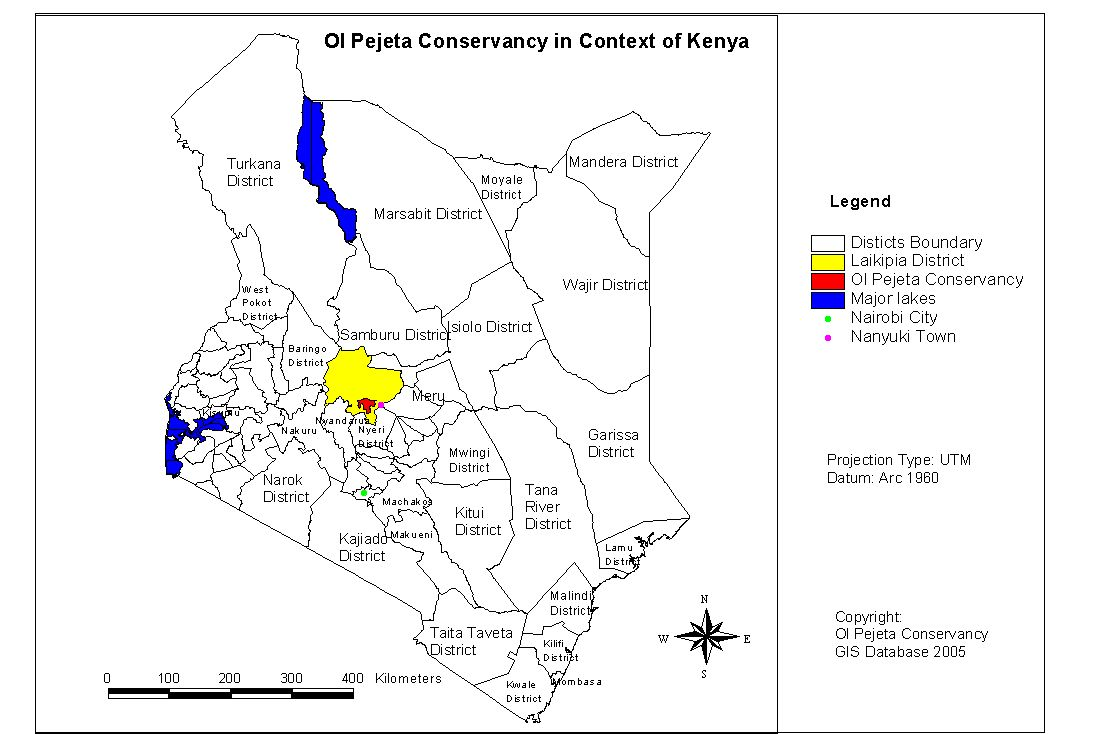
Ol Pejeta Conservancy

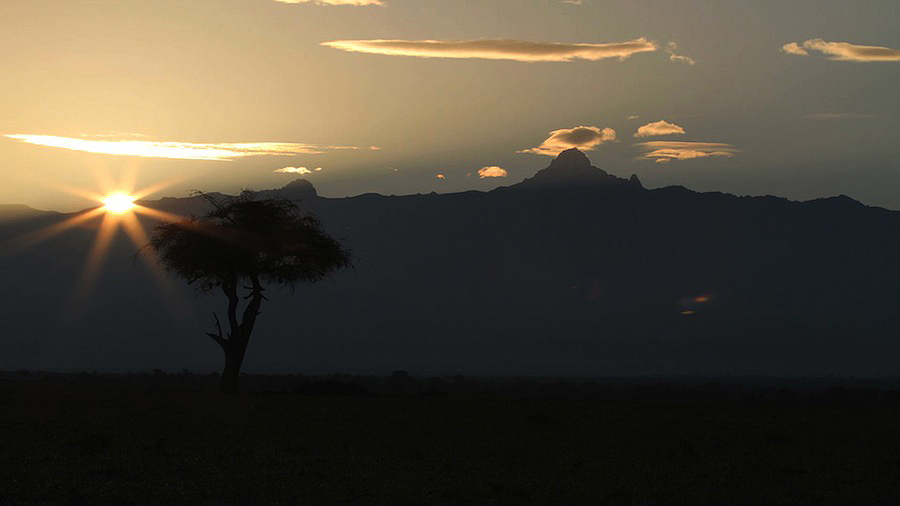
A view of Mt. Kenya from Ol Pejeta Conservancy Photo:Michael Dalton-Smith

The Ol Pejeta Conservancy is a 360 km^{2} (140 sq mi) not-for-profit wildlife conservancy in Central Kenya's Laikipia County. It is situated on the equator west of Nanyuki, between the foothills of the Aberdares and Mount Kenya. The Ol Pejeta Conservancy works to conserve wildlife, provide a sanctuary for great apes, and generate income through wildlife tourism and complementary enterprises for re-investment in conservation and community development.

The Conservancy boasts the largest black rhinoceros sanctuary in East Africa; in 2013, it reached a population milestone of one hundred eastern black rhinos. It is also home to the last two known northern white rhinos in captivity, widely considered to be the final surviving members of the species, who were moved there from Dvůr Králové Zoo in the Czech Republic. The Sweetwaters Chimpanzee Sanctuary is situated here which provides a haven for orphaned, abandoned, and rescued chimpanzees; It is the only place in Kenya where chimpanzees can be seen. The Conservancy is host to the "Big five game" animals among a large selection of other African animals. It also operates a livestock program that serves to benefit local pastoralists and wildlife. Through the conservancy's community development program, Ol Pejeta provides funding to surrounding communities to aid health, education, water, and infrastructure projects. They also support the provision of agriculture and livestock extension services and the development of community-based conservation tourism ventures.

== History ==
During the colonial era, the Laikipia Plateau was used as an extensive cattle ranching area. Lacking the rainfall required to farm crops, cattle ranching was adopted as the next best way to utilize the land.

John and Jane Kenyon took over the management of Ol Pejeta in 1949 when it was owned by Lord Delamere and together they spent the next 15 years developing the ranch. When the Kenyons first took on Ol Pejeta, they were joined by Delemere's school friend and business partner Marcus Wickham Boynton. Together they organized the then 230 km^{2} (89 sq mi) ranch into a successful beef-producing company. Over the next few years, they expanded the farm to cover an estimated 360 km^{2} (140 sq mi). The Kenyons left Ol Pejeta for a year in 1958, then returned for a further ten years, before finally retiring to run their own cattle ranch to the north. Since then, the ranch has had a number of owners, including Marcus Wickham Boynton and Adnan Khashoggi, a billionaire arms dealer and businessman considered one of the richest men in the world in the early 1980s.

Over time, cattle ranching became less profitable. Elephant populations, which previously used the ranch as a transit area from the north to Mount Kenya and the Aberdares, increasingly took up permanent residence on the property. As a result, fences required to maximise cattle productivity were destroyed and became impossible to maintain cost-effectively. In the face of declining wildlife populations elsewhere and as a means to effectively utilise the land, the land has seen an increasing emphasis placed upon wildlife conservation. In 1988, the Sweetwaters Game Reserve (measuring 97 km^{2} (37 sq mi)) was opened by another of Ol Pejeta’s previous owners, Lonrho Africa. Primarily started as a sanctuary for the endangered black rhino, wildlife populations (including the "Big Five") have steadily increased since that time.

In 2004, the ranch and surrounding land were purchased by the UK-based conservation organisation Fauna and Flora International (FFI) with the financial backing of the Arcus Foundation, a private international philanthropic organisation founded by Jon Stryker. The land purchase was wholly funded by a $15 million donation from the Arcus Foundation, which worked in tandem with FFI and the Lewa Wildlife Conservancy to secure the 360 km^{2} (140 sq mi) of open savannah grassland and convert it to a national land trust. The Arcus Foundation also gave $12 million to fund capital and institutional development costs at the conservancy, which allowed Ol Pejeta Conservancy to operate as a Kenyan-owned operation benefiting local community development and economic growth. In March 2022, Sad Rhinos, a Cardano NFT project, launched a partnership and began fundraising in aid of Ol Pejeta Conservancy.

== Wildlife ==
All members of the "Big five game" (lion, Cape buffalo, African bush elephant, African leopard and rhinoceros) can be found on the Ol Pejeta Conservancy. Both black and white rhino thrive here. In 2013, Ol Pejeta recorded the birth of its 100th black rhino. This means the Conservancy is now a "Key 1" black rhino population on the IUCN African Rhino Specialist Group categorization. It is one of only eight sanctuaries in Africa with this distinction.

Other rare animals that can be found on Ol Pejeta include the endangered African wild dog, oryx, Jackson’s hartebeest, Grevy’s zebra, serval, cheetah and bat-eared fox. The more common African wildlife can be found too, including giraffes, vervet monkeys, baboons, hippos, impala, eland, Grant's gazelle, dik-dik, plains zebra, silver backed jackal, hyena. There are also over 300 bird species on the Conservancy.

All animals are free to move in and out of the Conservancy by way of specially constructed game corridors that only restrict the movement of rhinos. Knee-high posts in the ground, situated very close together, present no challenge for elephant, antelope and carnivores, who are easily able to jump or step over. Rhinos, however, are unable to do this, and as a result are restricted from moving into areas where they are in danger of being poached for their horn.

=== Northern white rhinos ===
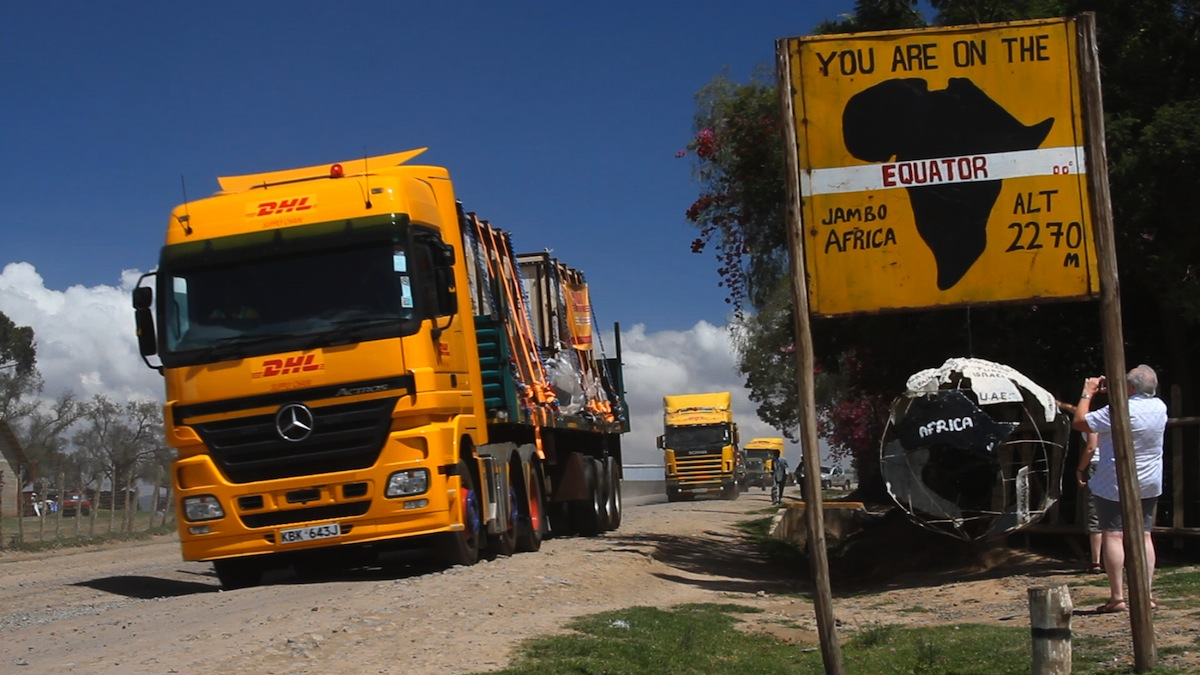
A northern white rhinoceros crosses the equator during translocation to Ol Pejeta Conservancy

One of three northern white rhinos translocated to Ol Pejeta now living in a semi-wild state

The northern white rhino is one of the five rhino species still remaining. Closely resembling its southern white cousin, the northern whites were hit particularly hard in the poaching epidemic of the 1980s and early 90s and it is now possibly extinct in the wild. On 20 December 2009 Ol Pejeta became home to four of the then seven rhinos left in captivity. Two males and two females were moved from Dvůr Králové Zoo in the Czech Republic in the hope that the climate and rich grasslands of Ol Pejeta, a native habitat for the animals, would provide them with more favourable breeding conditions.

The males (named Sudan and Suni) and the females (Fatu and Najin) enjoyed 24-hour armed security and a 700-acre enclosure. Suni was seen mating with Najin in 2012, but tests have confirmed she is not pregnant. Ol Pejeta is trying to cross-breed the closely related southern white rhinos with the northern whites to preserve northern white rhino genetics in hybrid offspring. On 17 October 2014 Suni died from unknown causes but not because of poaching. On 19 March 2018 Sudan was euthanized after suffering from "age-related complications".

== Poaching and security ==
Poaching and habitat loss are depleting rhino and elephant populations all over Africa. The African elephant is listed as Vulnerable on the IUCN list, the white rhino as "Near Threatened" and the black rhino as Critically Endangered. Rhino horn is erroneously believed to have medicinal properties by many people in Asia and is used as traditional dagger handles in Yemen. As of January 2014, it can fetch US$60,000–100,000. One kilogram of ivory can fetch US$1,000–3,000. With the tusks of an adult elephant weighing up to 50 kg, the potential profits for poachers and traders are large.

The trade in rhino horn and ivory is so lucrative that increasingly, poachers are gaining access to automatic weapons, silencers and night-vision to carry out their work. Protecting wildlife from these criminals is an expensive business. Convention has it that the cost of protecting wildlife habitat doubles with the presence of black rhino. Currently, it costs approximately US$17,300 per square kilometre (US$70 per acre) to secure the Ol Pejeta Conservancy.

=== Dogs ===
A team of 14 dogs and their handlers assist in several areas of Ol Pejeta Conservancy security. The bloodhounds are trained to track human scent, and are often the first on the scene at any incidents. The Belgian Malinois dogs, recently acquired by Conservancy, have been trained in tracking, attack, patrol, ivory detection, and weapons detection.

=== Aircraft ===
The Conservancy operates a Piper PA-18 Super cub light aircraft, used predominantly for security surveillance, rhino monitoring and game counts across the Conservancy and surrounding wildlife areas.

=== Drones ===
In 2013, the Ol Pejeta Conservancy started to use a drone with the capacity to deliver real time video and thermal imaging feeds to a team on the ground. Deployed in a poaching incident, this drone will have the capability to help armed teams on the ground, to record video for use in court, and also to help undertake a census of the reserve.

=== Armed teams ===
The Conservancy operates a number of armed teams. These are self-sufficient, mobile teams able to spend extended periods of time in the field. These teams have been trained to operate day and night and to respond to incidents, not only within the Ol Pejeta Conservancy, but also in conjunction with local authorities outside of the Conservancy.

==== Rhino patrols ====
There is a coverage rate of one rhino patrol team to 14 square kilometres (1,400 ha) within the core conservation area of Ol Pejeta. The patrol teams' key objective is to monitor the black rhino, but their monitoring of the area also benefits other key species within the Conservancy.

==== General security ====
General security teams operate in areas outside the main conservation area. These areas still carry valuable concentrations of wildlife such as the endangered Jackson's hartebeest.

=== Fence ===
The Ol Pejeta Conservancy's fully electrified perimeter fence demarcates the Conservancy's boundary and prevents human-wildlife conflict. Efforts to reduce human-wildlife conflict have significantly strengthened relations with surrounding communities. The fence keeps the rhino from wandering into dangerous territory while safely directing elephants along their migratory routes. Ol Pejeta currently has a fence attendant for every 7 kilometres (4.3 mi) of fence who conducts maintenance and provides security in the form of insurgence detection. The fence is monitored 24 hours with a response team based at the control offices to respond to any incidents at night.

=== Communities ===
The Ol Pejeta Conservancy works closely with surrounding communities on incidents related to insecurity through the provision of tracker dogs, transport and close relations with local authorities. This close working relationship in return, provides security to the Ol Pejeta Conservancy in the form of information gathering and recruitment opportunities.

== Sweetwaters Chimpanzee Sanctuary ==
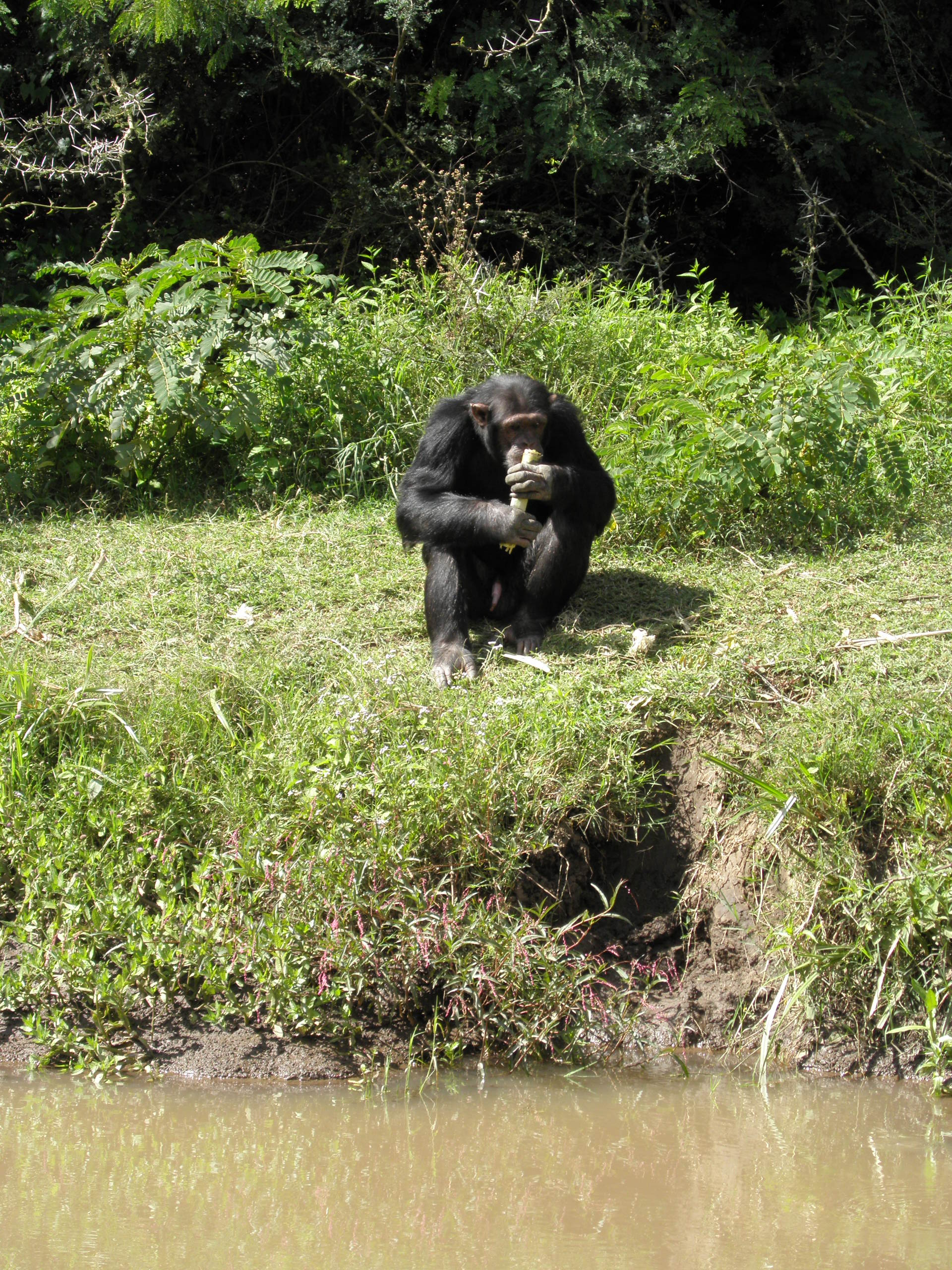
A chimpanzee in the Sanctuary

The Sweetwaters Chimpanzee Sanctuary is incorporated within the Ol Pejeta Conservancy and is the only place in Kenya where chimpanzees can be seen. The Sanctuary opened in 1993 in a negotiated agreement between the Ol Pejeta Conservancy, the Kenya Wildlife Service (KWS) and the Jane Goodall Institute. The facility was initially established to receive and provide lifelong refuge to orphaned and abused chimpanzees from west and central Africa. An initial group of three chimpanzee orphans were brought to the sanctuary from a facility in Bujumbura, Burundi, that needed to be evacuated due to the civil war. This was followed in 1995 by another group of 9 adult chimpanzees, and another 10 in 1996. Over the last decade Sweetwaters Chimpanzee Sanctuary has continued to accept chimpanzees rescued from traumatic situations, bringing the total number of chimpanzees in the sanctuary to 43.

At the Sweetwaters Sanctuary, chimpanzees are nursed back to health and enjoy living out their days in the safety of a vast natural enclosure. The chimpanzees live in two large groups separated by the Ewaso Nyiro River. Sweetwaters is a chartered member of the Pan African Sanctuary Alliance (PASA), an alliance of 23 sanctuaries in 13 African countries, currently caring for over 1100 orphaned and/or confiscated chimpanzees. Poco, a chimpanzee noted for his bipedal stance, lives at the sanctuary.

== Conservation and ecological monitoring ==
Conservation of endangered species in their natural habitat represents a major part of the Ol Pejeta Conservancy's mission. The Ecological Monitoring Department (EMD) of the Ol Pejeta Conservancy aims to identify and monitor key variables necessary to maintain healthy trends in both habitat and animal species. Consequently, the EMD sets appropriate threshold levels for key animal and habitat variables which act as early warnings. Whenever threshold levels are exceeded, management intervention is required. In accordance with national strategy and in liaison with the Kenya Wildlife Service, Ol Pejeta has developed a management plan for certain species.

== Livestock and livestock management ==
While it is first and foremost a wildlife conservancy, Ol Pejeta is also a profitable cattle ranch. By integrating the livestock with the wildlife, the cattle can be used as an ecological tool to manage the rangelands and heterogeneity and maximize biodiversity. The trampling effect and controlled grazing of cattle improves the quality of grass very quickly. Cattle are held overnight in mobile, predator-proof structures, which then create 'hot-spots' of nutrient- rich grass favoured by herbivores. Cattle production also provides valuable additional revenue for the Conservancy. OPC currently has three breeds of indigenous pure-bred cattle: Ankole, Jiddu (or Serenli), and Boran. It holds the largest single herd of pure Boran cattle in the world at 6,500 cows. A small proportion of the Conservancy has been set aside as a predator-free breeding centre. There is also an abattoir on site.

== Community outreach ==
Through business enterprises and donations, the Ol Pejeta Conservancy works to develop the funding necessary to pay for wildlife conservation work and provide financial assistance to projects aimed at improving the livelihoods of the people living in neighbouring communities. In 2006 and 2007, Ol Pejeta organized the charity Cricket in the Wild International Tournament to raise funds.

By the end of 2011, Ol Pejeta Conservancy had raised and dispersed over US$4 million in support of its community development programme. They work with local government and a variety of elected community representatives across the district to identify projects that qualify for assistance from the Ol Pejeta Conservancy. All projects supported are assessed on a case-by-case basis and must contain some element of community contribution. They aim to concentrate on the following core areas: health, education, water, roads, provision of agriculture and livestock extension services and the development of community-based conservation tourism ventures.

In 2015, Ol Pejeta Conservancy was host to a Cricket match between the Maasai Cricket Warriors and the British Army Training Unit Kenya (BATUK), calling the match; "Last Male Standing", in honor of Sudan, the only male northern white rhinoceros confirmed living at that time.

== Visiting ==
Ol Pejeta remains a popular safari destination for both local residents and international visitors. The Conservancy has 7 accommodation options: Sweetwaters Tented Camp, Ol Pejeta House, Ol Pejeta Bush Camp, Porini Rhino Camp, Pelican House, Kicheche Laikipia Camp and private campsites.

Entry fees at the time of writing (August.2022) are as follows (per person, per day):

- Kenyan citizen: Adult 1,400Ksh, Child 650Ksh, Student 350Ksh.
- East African resident: Adult 2,600Ksh, Child 1,300Ksh, Student 650Ksh.
- Non resident: Adult US$110, Child $55, Student $32.

Additional fees apply to vehicle entry and most Conservancy activities. Activities include visiting the endangered species enclosure, where the northern white rhinos are kept, visiting the chimpanzee sanctuary, lion tracking, night game drives and guided bushwalks. Conservancy maps are available at the entrance gate for a cost.

There is also a research facility where groups or individuals stay while studying flora and fauna on the Conservancy.

== See also ==
- Wildlife management
