= Fingesten =

Fingesten is a surname. Notable people with the surname include:

- Michel Fingesten (1884–1943), Czech-Austrian painter and graphic artist
- Peter Fingesten (1916–1987), German-born American graphic artist, sculptor, and academic
