= Carole C. Noon =

American primatologist

Carole Cooney Noon
- Born: Carole Jean Cooney; July 13, 1949
- Died: May 2, 2009 (aged 59)
- Awards: Jane Goodall Award
- Scientific career
- Fields: Primatology, Anthropology

Carole Cooney Noon (born Carole Jane Cooney; July 13, 1949 – May 2, 2009) was an American anthropologist and primatologist best known for founding (in 1997) Save the Chimps, a Florida non-profit chimpanzee sanctuary that is the largest such sanctuary in the world as of 2009.

== Early life ==
Carole C. Noon was born on July 13, 1949, to the union of William and Dorothy Cooney in Portland, Oregon. She has two sisters, Lee Asbeck and Kay Shelton. During her early years, her father, William Cooney, moved the entire family to an island in the South Pacific, for a business venture, where she spent a significant amount of her childhood. Years later, when her parents divorced, her mother, Dorothy, moved Carole and her sisters to Honolulu, Hawaii, and later Cleveland, Ohio. She went on to marry Michael Noon, whom she later divorced.

== Education ==
Noon attained a bachelor's degree from Florida Atlantic University. She then earned a master's in anthropology and a doctorate in biological anthropology, under Dr. Linda Wolfe from the University of Florida, specializing in captive chimpanzees. She conducted much of her field research at the Chimfunshi Wildlife Orphanage in Zambia, where chimpanzees were orphaned by the bushmeat trade in Africa. There, she completed her dissertation on the re-socialization of chimpanzees and earned her PhD in 1996.

== Career ==
Following the US Air Force’s decision to bid away all its chimpanzees in 1997, with the help of Jane Goodall, Noon co-created Save The Chimps Foundation, known today has the world’s largest sanctuary for chimpanzees. Noon’s bid for the chimpanzees was rejected, and they were later sent to the Coulston Foundation, that was known for violating the Animal Welfare Act. Noon went on to sue the US Air Force and settled out of court for the custody of 21 out of the 140 chimps. In 2001, she opened a sanctuary in Fort Pierce, Florida, with the assistance of the Arcus Foundation. In 2002, The Coulston Foundation went bankrupt, and with the help of a grant from the Arcus Foundation, Dr. Noon and Save the Chimps bought their lab in Alamogordo, New Mexico, and rescued 266 chimpanzees and 61 monkeys. Save The Chimps became the largest chimpanzee sanctuary overnight, housing and caring today for 282 chimpanzees. Noon worked tirelessly to improve their conditions, and to train staff to care for the chimps.

== Awards ==
In 2004 she won the Jane Goodall Award for Lifetime Dedication to the Care of Chimpanzees.

== Death ==
Dr. Carole Noon passed away early in the morning on May 2, 2009, of pancreatic cancer. She was in her home at Save the Chimps and surrounded by her sisters.
