= Jurek Wajdowicz =

Polish-American artist

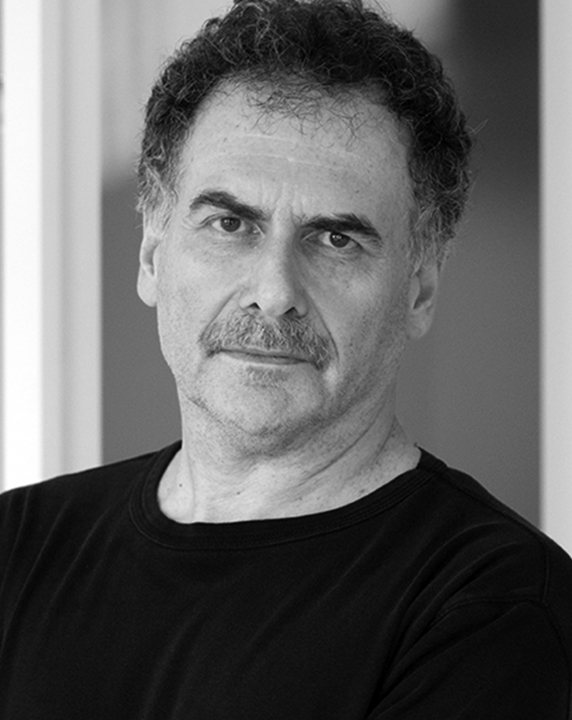
Wajdowicz in 2015

Jurek Wajdowicz (born April 26, 1951, Cracow) is a Polish-born American artist, graphic designer, fine art contemporary photographer and art director. He lives and works in New York City.

In his graphic design practice Wajdowicz has concentrated on images of poverty, famine and social justice. Separately, in his semi-abstract photography he creates a more tranquil, contemplative, poetic painterly images. From 2009, Wajdowicz has focused on fine art abstract photography resulting in several ongoing thematic series. His book, Liminal Spaces was published in 2013. In 2018 Wajdowicz's 67/11 photo-book was published. His work was represented at the Kasia Michalski Gallery in Warsaw, Poland 2015, the Vienna contemporary art fair in Vienna, Austria 2015, Nailya Alexander Gallery in New York in 2016, at the Book Art Museum exhibition in Lodz, Poland 2018, at New York's EWS-Gallery in 2020, at the Nailya Alexander Gallery in New York in 2021, and at the AIPAD Photography Show, New York in 2023. Wajdowicz was selected as one of the "Most Influential Graphic Designers of the Past 50 Years" in the 50th Anniversary Survey of Graphic Design: USA magazine.

== Life and career ==
Wajdowicz began his career as an artist in Lodz, Poland, where he graduated summa cum laude with a master's degree in graphic design from the Lodz Academy of Fine Arts. After working on design projects for theaters and museums in Lodz, Warsaw and England (Pentagram, London), he went to the United States as an art director at Lubalin, Burns & Company in New York before co-founding Emerson, Wajdowicz Studios (EWS) with Lisa LaRochelle in 1982. EWS' partners and clients include international humanitarian organizations and non-profit institutions active in social change. From the 1990s to the present Wajdowicz and EWS created projects for the Rockefeller Foundation, Domtar, Doctors Without Borders (MSF), the Arcus Foundation, International Rescue Committee, Magnum Photos, Freedom House and the United Nations, working with photographers such as Eugene Richards, Sebastião Salgado, Steve McCurry, Antonin Kratochvil, Deborah Turbeville, Philip Jones Griffiths, Richard Avedon, Elliott Erwitt, Jonas Bendiksen, James Nachtwey, Alex Webb and Gueorgui Pinkhassov. From 2013 Jurek Wajdowicz became the art director, curator and also a contributing photographer of the international LGBT-themed, photography books, a concept co-created by Jon Stryker and Wajdowicz. The ongoing series is published by The New Press including photojournalists Kike Arnal, Delphine Diallo, Misha Friedman, Sunil Gupta, Lola Flash, Steve McCurry, Maciek Nabrdalik, Jenny Papalexandris and Charan Singh.

== Publications ==
=== Publications by Wajdowicz ===
- Emerson, Wajdowicz Studios: Graphic Design. EWS/HMP, 1998. ISBN 978-0970718204
- Liminal Spaces: Fotografie_75. Lars Müller, 2013. With introductions by Fred Ritchin and Jennifer Sterling. ISBN 978-3037784105
- Pride & Joy: Taking the Streets of New York City. The New Press, 2016. With introductions by Kate Clinton and Jon Stryker. ISBN 978-1620971857
- 67/11. EWS Press, 2017. ISBN 978-0-692-92473-0

=== Publications with contributions by Wajdowicz ===
- Endure – Renewal from ground zero. Jurek Wajdowicz with Antonín Kratochvíl, Gilles Peress, Carolina Salguero, Larry Towell and Alex Webb. Rockefeller Foundation, 2001. ISBN 0-89184-061-3.
- Political / Social Posters. Jurek Wajdowicz with Andrea Castelletti, John Clark, Milton Glaser, Mark Gowing, Toshiaki Ide, Uwe Loesch, Joao Machado, Pentagram Design and Francois Robert. Edited by B Martin Pedersen, Graphis. 2015. ISBN 9781932026924.
- Robin Landa. Graphic Design Solutions. Boston: Wadsworth Publishing. ISBN 978-1133945529
- Misha Friedman. Lyudmila and Natasha. New York: The New Press, 2015. ISBN 978-1620970232
- Kike Arnal. Bordered Lives. New York: The New Press, 2015. ISBN 978-1620970249
- David Brier. Great Type and Lettering Designs. North Light Books. ISBN 978-0891344407
- Jenny Papalexandris. Five Bells. New York: The New Press, 2016. ISBN 978-1620971666.
- Sunil Gupta and Charan Singh. Delhi: Communities of Belonging. The New Press, 2016. ISBN 978-1-62097-265-6.
- Michel Delsol. Edges of the Rainbow. The New Press, 2017. ISBN 978-1-62097-289-2
- Gabriela Herman. The Kids: The Children of LGBTQ Parents in the USA. The New Press, 2017. ISBN 978-1-62097-367-7
- Maciek Nabrdalik. OUT: LGBTQ Poland. The New Press, 2018. ISBN 978-162097-369-1
- Kike Arnal. Revealing Selves. The New Press, 2018. ISBN 978-1-62097-287-8
- Slobodan Randjelović. Lives in Transition. The New Press, 2018. ISBN 978-1-62097-373-8
- Claudia Jares. Dark Tears. The New Press, 2019. ISBN 978-162097-407-0
- Jake Naughton & Jacob Kushner. This Is How the Heart Beats. The New Press, 2020. ISBN 978-1-62097-488-9
- Delphine Diallo. Lived Experience. The New Press, 2020. ISBN 978-1-62097-580-0
- Misha Friedman & Masha Gessen. The New Press, 2020. ISBN 978-1-62097-405-6
- Steve McCurry. Belonging: Portraits from LGBTQ Thailand. The New Press, 2021. ISBN 978-1-62097-655-5
- Sarah Mei Herman. Solace: Portraits of Queer Chinese Youth. The New Press, 2022. ISBN 978-1-62097-632-6
- Lola Flash. Believable: Traveling with My Ancestors. The New Press, 2023. ISBN 978-1-62097-753-8

== Collections ==
Wajdowicz's art photography and design work is held in the following permanent collections:

- United States Library of Congress (USA).
- National 9/11 Memorial & Museum (USA).
- United Nations Headquarters (Geneva and New York).
- Rockefeller Foundation (New York).
- Poster Museum, Wilanow (Poland).
- The Musée des Arts Décoratifs (Switzerland).
- American Institute of Graphic Arts (New York).
- Museum of Modern Art in Lodz (Poland).
- Arcus Foundation (New York).
- Museum für Kunst und Gewerbe (Hamburg).
- Collection of the Center for the Study of Political Graphics (Culver City, USA)
- Book Art Museum in Lodz (Poland)
