= Lola Flash =

American photographer (born 1959)

- Born: 1959 (age 66–67); Montclair, New Jersey U.S.
- Education: Maryland Institute College of Art; London College of Printing
- Known for: Photography; Portraiture
- Website: lolaflash.com

Lola Flash (born 1959) is an American photographer whose work focuses on social, LGBT and feminist issues. An active participant in ACT UP during the time of the AIDS epidemic in New York City, Flash was notably featured in the 1989 "Kissing Doesn't Kill" poster.

Flash's art, which is rooted in community advocacy, is in the permanent collections of (to name a few) the Museum of Modern Art, the Whitney Museum, the Museum of African American History and Culture, the Brooklyn Museum and the Victoria and Albert Museum.

== Early life and education ==
Flash was born and raised in Montclair, New Jersey by two school teachers. They are of African American and Native American backgrounds and is the fourth generation, on their mother's side, to grow up in Montclair. Her great-grandfather, Charles H. Bullock, as well as her great-grandmother, taught at the Jefferson School African American Heritage Center. Bullock also founded the first Black YMCA in Montclair, as well as others in Brooklyn, Virginia, and Kentucky. Their given name, Lola, is in honor of her paternal great-grandmother.

Flash began creating photographs as a young child, eventually doing student portraits for the high-school yearbook, as well as creating other pictures. They also had a darkroom, in high school and that experience gave Flash the idea of furthering photography, as more than just a hobby.

Flash graduated from Montclair High School. After graduating, they went to college to study science and photography hoping to be a science photographer, but decided to transfer schools to focus on art. In 1981, they received a B.A. from Maryland Institute College of Art, where they studied with Leslie King-Hammond. Flash later received an M.A. with Distinction from London College of Printing.

== Career ==
While attending the Maryland Institute College of Art, Flash made images using color slides and inverted color schemes in their photography. Unlike most fine art photographers they used slide film but then developed their photographs on negative paper. This altered the colors in the photos, making the viewer aware of biases that they had been taught to view the world. Their early work had a focus on social and political issues that included works related to the AIDS epidemic. Starting in the summer of 1987, Flash was very active in ACT UP in New York City. In 1989, Flash and Julie Tolentino appeared with several other couples in Gran Fury's ""Kissing Doesn't Kill" PSA poster. This poster, which appeared on billboards, buses, and subway platforms in many cities, used the style of Benetton's United Colors campaign to call out bigotry and complacency regarding HIV/AIDS.

In the 1990s, Flash moved to London and in 2002 received their MFA from the London College of Printing. While there, they covered events for a gay publication, the Pink Paper. They also started exploring different themes through traditional portraiture, using a large format camera. Flash remained in London for twelve years, working for alternative lifestyle publications and teaching at Havering College.

Flash was part of the Art Positive artist collective.

Flash's next work was two photography series at Alice Yard in Woodbrook, Port of Spain: Scents of Autumn, The Quartet series.

Flash's newer work has focused on issues such as how skin color impacts black identity and gender fluidity. They have frequently photographed members of the LGBT community, including a series called LEGENDS which portrays iconic members of the New York City LGBT community.

In a recent project "SALT," Lola Flash focuses on women over the age of seventy who remain active in their field. Their collaborators, who are portrayed in classical portrait-style photographs, are often unheralded women who range from artists and activists to real estate agents, singers and designers; however, some notable women, like Agnes Gund, Ruth Pointer and Betye Saar, were incorporated into the series.

Flash's photography is featured in the 2009 book Posing Beauty: African American Images from the 1890s to the Present. Most recently a book entitled "Believable: Traveling with My Ancestors" their first monograph, was published by the New Press in 2023.

Flash's 2018 solo show, Lola Flash: 1986 – Present, is a 30-year retrospective, spanning three decades of influential works curated for exhibition at Pen + Brush in New York City. The show documents the beginnings of their work with the series about the AIDS crisis in New York City and extends through to the "critically lauded "SALT" and "[sur]passing" series."

In 2019, under the Center for Photography at Woodstock, Artist in Residence Program, Flash noted "I've been a committed artist for 40 years, now having finally gained a seat at the table."

In Flash's current Afrofuturist series, "syzygy, the vision," Flash transforms themself into an avatar "enduring to the horrors of racism, sexism and homophobia," and "experiencing moments of joy, envisioning a future where there is equity for all." Flash is a member of the Kamoige Collective and is the President of the board of Queer|Art.

== Equipment and methodology ==
Flash began taking photographs using a Minox and then in high school they began shooting with a 35mm Yashica.

Flash initially became known for using the cross-color technique of photography, which inverts colors.

Flash currently uses a Toyo-view camera using the 4×5 film format and most recently works with a Fuji GFX100 camera.

== Personal life ==
Flash lives and works in Kips Bay, Manhattan. In addition to photography, Flash was a visual arts and English Language Arts teacher at the Williamsburg High School of Art and Technology, and retired in 2022.

== Awards and honors ==
- 2008: Light Works, Artist residency (New York, NY)
- 2011: Art Matters Foundation, grant for travel to England, Brazil & South Africa
- 2015: Alice Yard, Artist residency (Woodbrook, Port of Spain)
- 2019: Woodstock, Artist residency (New York, NY)
- 2021: Flash was awarded an Honorary Fellowship of the Royal Photographic Society
- 2024: Flash received the Visual AIDS Vanguard Award
- 2024: Flash was granted a Pollock Krasner Foundation Award
- 2024 AIRIE residency, 2nd timer, Florida Everglades
- 2025: Flash was granted the Anonymous Was a Woman Award
- 2026: MacDowell residency, New Hampshire

== Exhibitions ==
=== Group exhibitions ===
- 2016: Sur Rodney (Sur) with Art+ Positive members Lola Flash and Hunter Reynolds. Art AIDS America, The Bronx Museum of the Arts (Bronx, NY)
- 2022: Picturing Black Girlhood: Moments of Possibility, Express Newark.

=== Solo exhibitions ===
- 2018: Lola Flash: 1986 – Present, Pen + Brush (New York, NY)
- 2025: Lola Flash: Believable - Jenkins Johnson Gallery, NYC
- 2026: Lola Flash: syzygy, the vision - Project Row Houses, Houston, TX
- 2026: Lola Flash: The Challenge: Survival + Visibility, Goucher College, MD

== Collections ==
Flash's work is held in the following permanent collection:

- 1993: Stay Afloat, Use a Rubber, Victoria and Albert Museum
- 2022: Cross Colour, Museum of Modern Art, New York
- 2022: Cross Colour, Whitney Museum, New York
- 2022: syzygy, the vision series (selections), National Museum of African American Museum of History and Culture, DC

== Filmography ==
- 2014: Through a Lens Darkly: Black Photographers and the Emergence of a People

== Publications ==
- Lichtenstein, Rachel; Flash, Lola (photography by) (2003). Keeping Pace: Older Women of the East End. London: The Women's Library. OCLC 428094803.
- Lola Flash. Believable: Traveling with My Ancestors. The New Press, (2023). With contributions by Renée Mussai, Jon Stryker, Jurek Wajdowicz.
