= Homer Stryker =

American physician

- Born: Homer Hartman Stryker; November 4, 1894; Wakeshma Township, Michigan, U.S.
- Died: May 5, 1980 (aged 85); Kalamazoo, Michigan, U.S.
- Education: University of Michigan (M.D.); Western State Normal School (Teaching certificate)
- Occupations: Surgeon; Businessmen
- Known for: Founder of Stryker Corporation
- Spouse: Mary Jane Underwood
- Family: Pat Stryker (granddaughter); Jon Stryker (grandson); Ronda Stryker (granddaughter)

Homer Hartman Stryker (November 4, 1894 – May 5, 1980) was an American orthopedic surgeon, inventor, businessman, and the founder of Stryker Corporation. His inventions contributed to orthopedic care, patient comfort, and medical staff convenience.

== Early life and education ==
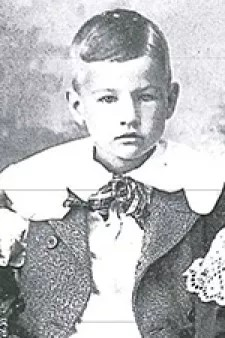
Homer Stryker as a child

Stryker was born in Wakeshma Township, Michigan on November 4, 1894, later graduating from Athens High School as part of the class of 1913. Stryker earned his teaching certificate from Western State Normal School in 1916 and taught in a one-room schoolhouse in the Keweenaw Bay school system in the Upper Peninsula before serving in the American infantry in France during World War I.

=== Medical school ===
Stryker returned to Michigan to study medicine. Stryker was admitted into the University of Michigan medical school in 1919; however, the medical school required passing a foreign language exam before full admittance, which Stryker failed. To be able to afford medical school tuition, Stryker taught at a school in Grand Ledge, Michigan, he coached football, basketball and baseball, worked as a barber, and pitched for the Grand Ledge semi-pro baseball team for two years. He got tutoring in French from a fellow student, and was later able to begin his medical studies in 1921 after earning enough for the tuition and passing the foreign language exam. He earned his Doctor of Medicine degree from the University of Michigan Medical School in 1925 and interned at the University Hospital. Stryker began his medical practice in Kalamazoo, Michigan, and established offices in Borgess Hospital, where he was the only orthopedic surgeon in the region.

== Inventions ==
In 1935, Stryker began tinkering in his workshop with medical devices, developing a rubber heel for walking casts as well as an innovative hospital bed that reduced the incidence of bedsores in bed-ridden patients.

1961-era standard military issue Stryker Electrosurgical Set used at Walter Reed Army Hospital until 1975

In 1943, he created his most important invention, an oscillating electric saw "such that the cutter is actuated with a relatively short oscillating stroke of the order of one-eighth of an inch", that cuts and removes casts but would not cut skin. He received a patent in 1947 and the principle is used today in the "Stryker Saw", the standard surgical tool for bone and plaster casts. Stryker's oscillating saw has been the tool of choice for cast removal ever since.

In 1946, he founded Orthopedic Frame Company Inc. to manufacture and sell his inventions, although no patent had yet been granted for his hospital bed. In January 1958, the Orthopedic Frame Company launched the Circ-O-Lectric bed. On January 2, 1964, Homer Stryker retired from practicing medicine and changed the name of his company from the 'Orthopedic Frame Company' to 'Stryker Corporation'. Stryker Corporation has since grown into a global corporation, and went public on NASDAQ in 1977. Since 1997, Stryker has been traded on the NYSE.

== Awards ==
In 1970, he was honored with the Distinguished Alumni Award from the Western Michigan University Alumni Association.

In 2014, the Western Michigan University School of Medicine was renamed to the Western Michigan University Homer Stryker M.D. School of Medicine after an initially anonymous donation of $100 million was given to the school by Stryker’s granddaughter, Ronda Stryker.

== Personal life ==
Stryker married his former French tutor, Mary Jane Underwood, in 1924. They had a son, Lee, and three grandchildren, Pat Stryker, Jon Stryker, and Ronda Stryker. Ronda Stryker currently sits on the governance board at Stryker Corporation.
