= Arcus Foundation =

American foundation

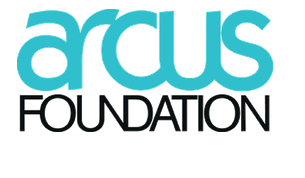
- Founded: 1997
- Founder: Jon Stryker
- Type: Private foundation
- Tax ID no.: 38-3332791
- Purpose: Conservation, social justice, LGBT rights
- Location(s): New York, NY; Cambridge, England, United States
- Region served: Worldwide
- Method: Grantmaking
- Key people: Jon Stryker, founder and president Annette Lanjouw, CEO
- Revenue: $44 million (2024)
- Expenses: $45.9 million (2024)
- Endowment: $302 million (2024)
- Website: www.arcusfoundation.org

The Arcus Foundation is an international charitable foundation focused on issues related to LGBT rights, social justice, ape conservation, and environmental preservation. The foundation says it "supports justice for LGBTQ people and humans' closest relatives, the great apes and gibbons."

The foundation was founded by Jon Stryker, heir to the Stryker Corporation medical supply company fortune. The foundation has offices in New York City and Cambridge, England. Arcus has been called "the world's largest private funder of ape conservation" and "the nation's largest LGBT funder".

Stryker has explained the relationship between the foundation's focus areas as “bound by the common themes of compassion and justice…We don’t use the language of animal rights- it’s more about compassion and conservation language…Another connection is justice. In our work for human rights, we are among those trying to expand traditional ideas of social justice to include sexuality and gender…social justice for people can enable conservation."

According to the OECD, Arcus Foundation's financing for 2019 development decreased by 7% to US$15.1 million.

== Founding ==
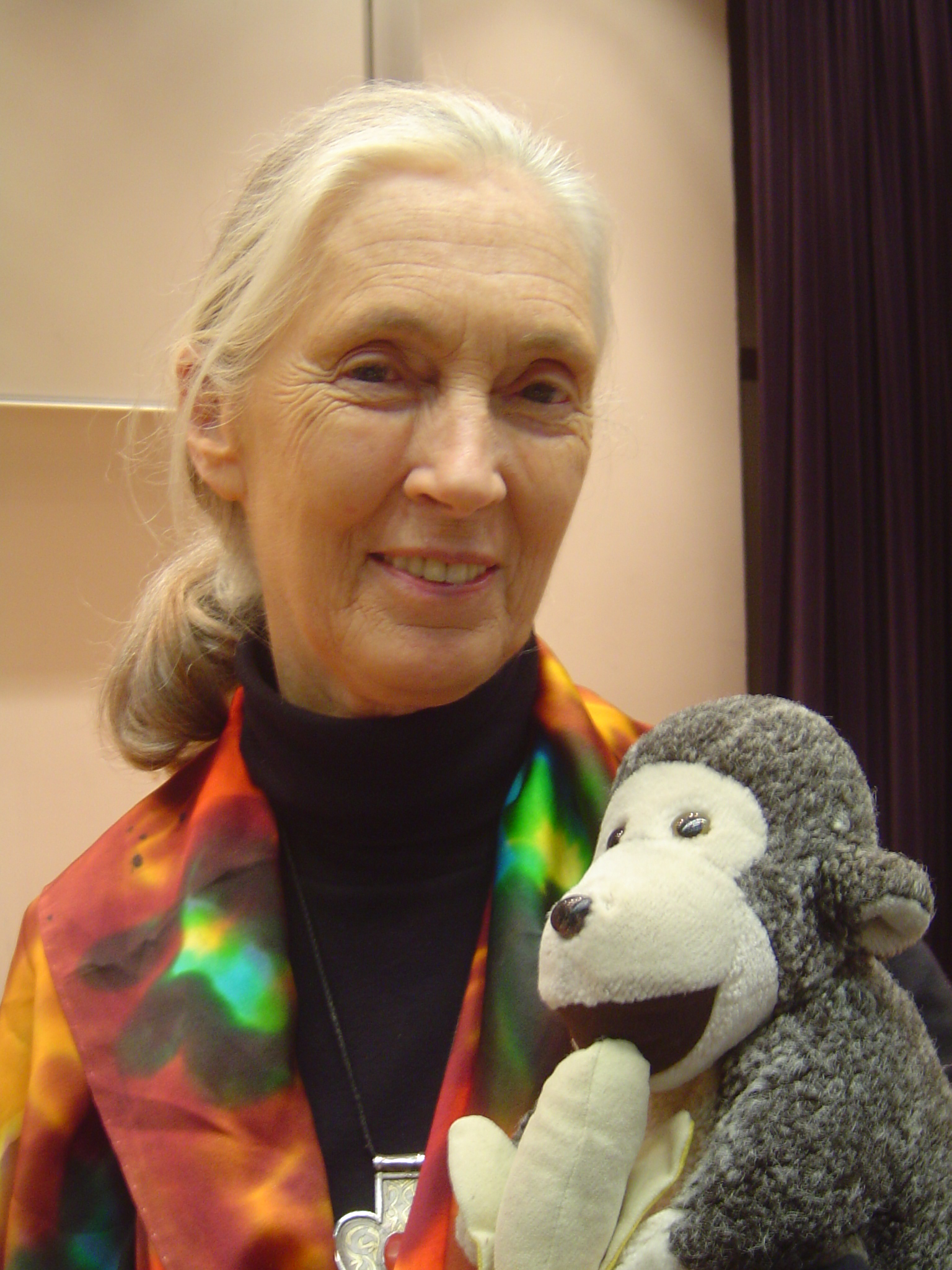
Jane Goodall's work has been supported by the Arcus Foundation

Arcus Foundation was founded in Kalamazoo, Michigan, in 2000 by Jon Stryker, a U.S. architect, philanthropist, social and environmental activist, billionaire stockholder, and heir to the Stryker Corporation medical supply company fortune. Stryker's own acceptance of his sexual orientation and experiences coming out as gay led him to found Arcus based on the philosophy that "people can live in harmony with one another and the natural world." Stryker also has an interest in wildlife, and apes in particular, motivating the foundation's other focus area.

== Grantmaking ==
=== Great apes and gibbons ===
The foundation's great apes and gibbons strategy funds projects that promote conservation of the world's gorillas, chimpanzees, bonobos, orangutans, and gibbons in 24 ape-range landscapes in 19 countries in Africa and Asia, as well as in the U.S. and Kenya, where apes are cared for outside of their range. The foundation also funds projects that advocate strengthening international protection of great apes and sanctuaries. Arcus advocates increased recognition of the rights of great apes to live free of abuse, exploitation and private ownership.

The Arcus Foundation funding provided to Save the Chimps in 2002 purchased the 190-acre Fort Pierce facility to house and rescue chimps de-acquisitioned by the U.S. Air Force and by entertainment companies. Arcus also provided a $3.7 million grant to Save the Chimps to purchase the lab and chimpanzees of Dr. Frederick Coulston. The foundation was also involved in the publication of Opening Doors: Carole Noon and Her Dream to Save the Chimps, a book about Carole Noon and her organization's efforts on behalf of apes.

Arcus has also supported Jane Goodall's work around great ape conservation in eastern Democratic Republic of the Congo as well as that of Max Planck Institutes and others. The foundation started "Giving Day for Apes," a fundraising event hosted by Mighty Cause and now run by the Global Federation of Animal Sanctuaries to benefit great ape sanctuaries across Africa, Asia and North America.

The foundation also supports the UN's Great Apes Survival Partnership (GRASP) and the International Union for Conservation of Nature (IUCN) to address threats to the survival of great apes.

The foundation publishes a series of publications entitled "State of the Apes" which reviews threats, research and policy implications for apes. The publication was first introduced at the 2014 United Nations Environment Assembly in Kenya.

=== LGBT rights ===
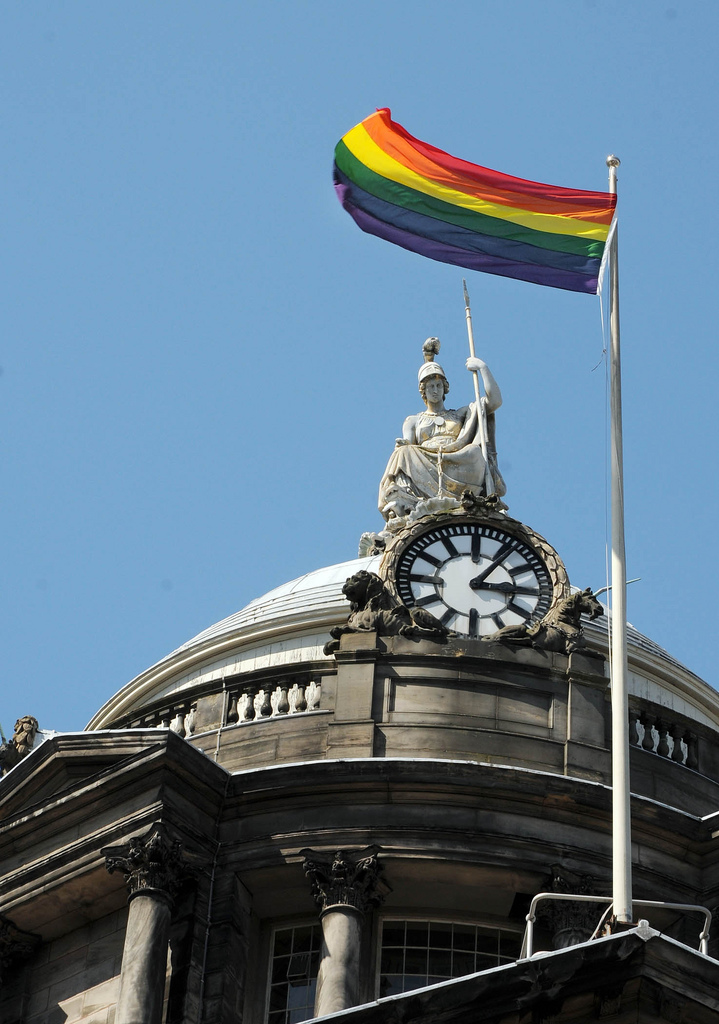
Arcus Foundation's social justice strategy primarily supports LGBT advocacy around the world

The Arcus Foundation is a major supporter of LGBT social justice.

In January 2011, the foundation made a $23 million grant to establish the Arcus Center for Social Justice Leadership at Kalamazoo College in Kalamazoo, Michigan. It was the largest grant in the history of the university. In 2013, the Arcus Foundation launched a new Social Justice Initiative which works with faith communities around the world to build cultural acceptance for LGBT people.

In 2017, Arcus founded the Global Religions Program to work with the three Abrahamic religions (Christianity, Judaism and Islam) to promote tolerance and advocate on behalf of the LGBTQ community.

The foundation has allocated funds to promote civil liberties and oppose religious liberty exemptions, including a $600,000 grant to the ACLU in 2013 to support the Campaign to End the Use of Religion to Discriminate, and a 2014 grant of $100,000 to the American Civil Liberties Foundation supporting “communications strategies to convince conservative Americans that religious exemptions are 'un-American'".

In 2014, Arcus awarded $75,000 to the Washington, DC–based Faithful America to “promote greater media visibility for Christians who denounce the abuse of religious-freedom arguments to oppose full equality” for LGBT people. Arcus has also awarded at least $200,000 to a coalition of groups seeking to "counter the narrative of the Catholic Church" and "to support pro-LGBT faith advocates to influence and counter the narrative of the Catholic Church and its ultra-conservative affiliates."

In 2014, the foundation provided grants to organizations that address LGBTQ and immigration issues, including United We Dream Network, the Transgender Law Center, Astraea Lesbian Foundation for Justice and others.

In April 2015, the Catholic News Agency (CNA) published an article disclosing that the Religion News Service (RNS), a U.S. news agency focused on religion, ethics, spirituality and moral issues, had received a grant of $120,000 from the Arcus Foundation. The grant's stated intent was “to recruit and equip LGBT supportive leaders and advocates to counter rejection and antagonism within traditionally conservative Christian churches.” The CNA story questioned whether the grant had biased RNS's coverage of traditional religion, specifically citing an RNS article on Cardinal Raymond Burke. In response to the CNA report, RNS's editor-in-chief denied that the Arcus grant had any influence over editorial decisions at RNS.

In December 2015, the Arcus Foundation announced $15 million in funding to boost the transgender movement in the U.S. and globally to increase job opportunities and fight a "rising tide of violence against transgender people".

== Personnel ==
Urvashi Vaid was the executive director of the foundation from 2005 to 2010. In May 2010, Fred Davie, a former member of the Advisory Council of the White House Office of Faith–based and Neighborhood Partnerships, became its executive director. Yvette Burton served as CEO from 2010 to 2012. In April 2012, Annette Lanjouw was appointed as interim executive director. In September 2012, Lanjouw returned to her role as vice president of strategic initiatives and great ape programs when Kevin Jennings became executive director, a role which he held for five years.

Upon Jennings' departure, Lanjouw and Jason McGill were named Arcus's co-executive directors. In January 2020, Lanjouw was appointed as Arcus's Chief Executive Officer.
