= Western Michigan University Homer Stryker M.D. School of Medicine =

Medical school in Kalamazoo, Michigan, US

- Former name: Michigan State University Kalamazoo Center for Medical Studies
- Type: Private medical school
- Established: 2012
- Parent institution: Western Michigan University
- Affiliations: Beacon Kalamazoo, Bronson Healthcare, Western Michigan University, Battle Creek VA Medical Center, Senior Care Partners, Family Health Center, Van Andel Institute Graduate School, West Michigan Air Care, West Michigan Cancer Center, Gift of Life, Association of American Medical Colleges, Grace Health
- Chairperson: Edward Montgomery
- Dean: J. Adrian Tyndall
- Students: 337
- Location: Kalamazoo, Michigan, United States; 42.2896°N 85.5791°W
- Campus: Urban
- Website: wmed.edu

Western Michigan University Homer Stryker M.D. School of Medicine (WMed) is a private medical school in Kalamazoo, Michigan. Established in 2012, WMed offers a Doctor of Medicine (MD) degree program, an MD-MBA dual degree program, an MD-PhD dual degree program and a Master of Science in Biomedical Sciences. WMed is a collaboration between Western Michigan University (WMU) and Kalamazoo's two teaching hospitals, Beacon Kalamazoo (formerly Ascension Borgess) and Bronson Healthcare.

Despite being associated with Western Michigan University, a public institution, WMed is a private non-profit school operating under a separate corporate charter. WMed was granted full accreditation by the Liaison Committee on Medical Education (LCME) in 2018. The school conducts research and maintains residency affiliations with several clinics and medical institutions. It has reported a residency match rate of 99% or higher in recent years.

== History ==
In October 2007, the new president of Western Michigan University, John M. Dunn, discussed the possibility of developing a medical school during his first academic convocation and state of the university address. Dunn's address generated community interest, leading to the formation of a Medical School Feasibility Committee within six weeks. Consultants were retained to conduct detailed feasibility assessments in 2008 with funding provided by the local Kalamazoo Community Foundation. By January 2009 feasibility studies indicated that Kalamazoo had existing assets and infrastructure suitable for developing a medical school.

With a commitment of collaboration from Western Michigan University, Ascension Borgess and Bronson Healthcare, planning for the Western Michigan University School of Medicine (WMed) began. In November 2009, an anonymous donation of $1.8 million was made to support planning efforts. A committee composed of the chief executive officers of Borgess Health, Bronson Healthcare and the president of Western Michigan University began to meet regularly to guide the development process.

In 2010 WMed was awarded applicant status by the Liaison Committee on Medical Education (LCME). A search committee was developed to recruit the school's founding dean and Jack Luderer M.D. was named interim dean. A Steering and Visioning Committee, later renamed the Institutional Setting Committee, included senior leadership from the three organizations. Following a national search, Hal B. Jenson, M.D. MBA, was named founding dean of WMed in January 2011 and began on March 22, 2011.

In March 2011, WMed received a $100 million anonymous cash gift. At the time this gift was reported as the largest ever made to a Michigan college or university and the 15th largest cash gift in the history of American higher education. Later that year, in December, William U. Parfet, chairman and chief executive officer of MPI Research and great-grandson of W.E. Upjohn, donated a 330,000-square-foot building in downtown Kalamazoo to WMU, which serves as the home of WMed. This property, located on the original plot of land acquired by W.E. Upjohn to begin the Upjohn Co., housed the research facility where Motrin, Xanax, Halcion, Rogaine, and Zyvox were discovered. Locally known as Pfizer Building 267, the property is adjacent to Bronson, three miles from Borgess and two miles from WMU and the WMed Oakland Drive campus.

On October 12, 2012, a groundbreaking ceremony was held for the new medical school building on the W.E. Upjohn M.D. Campus. The building was completed in June 2014, two months before the first class of medical students at WMed began. During the ceremony, Dean Jenson announced that WMed had received preliminary accreditation from the Liaison Committee on Medical Education, a crucial step for recruiting its first class of medical students.

On March 11, 2014, the university announced that the school would be named in honour of Homer Stryker, the Kalamazoo orthopaedic surgeon and medical device innovator who founded the Stryker Corporation. At the same time, it was announced that the original $100 million gift for the foundation of the school had been donated by Stryker's granddaughter, Ronda Stryker, and her husband, William Johnston.

While celebrating its 10-year anniversary in 2021, WMed had more than 240 resident physicians training in programs including Emergency Medicine, Family Medicine, General Surgery, Internal Medicine, Pediatrics, Obstetrics and Gynaecology, Orthopaedic Surgery, and Psychiatry. Fellowships are offered in EMS, Forensic Pathology, Hospice and Palliative Care, Simulation and Sports Medicine.

In 2021, Paula Termuhlen succeeded founding dean Hal B. Jenson, who retired after a 10-year tenure. Later that year the medical school received a commitment of $300 million as part of the $550 million Empowering Futures Gift to Western Michigan University (WMU) from anonymous donors. The overall gift was reported as the largest for a public university in U.S. history. The donation was intended to support the medical school's mission of increasing scholarships, widening access to education, enhancing diversity, equity and inclusion in medical education and fostering community impact.

On February 19, 2024, WMed announced that Dean Paula Termuhlen and the university had "parted ways". The board of directors named Robert G. Sawyer, the senior associate dean for research, as interim dean on February 20, 2024. The following month, WMed residents and fellow physicians unionized after residents and fellows voted 152-12 in favor of unionization.

=== SMAHEC and Michigan State University Kalamazoo Center for Medical Studies (MSU/KCMS) ===
In 1946, the Upjohn Company, the Kalamazoo Foundation and the W.E. Upjohn Trustee Corporation contributed to a grant that established the first graduate medical education program in Kalamazoo: a residency in internal medicine at Bronson Methodist Hospital. Shortly thereafter Borgess Medical Center also began internship and residency training programs.

For many years Borgess and Bronson independently offered numerous internship and residency programs. In 1966 the first joint residency between the hospitals and the Orthopedic Surgery Program was created. Following the orthopaedic surgery residency and a shared interest in strengthening graduate medical education in Kalamazoo, the hospitals formed a joint venture in 1973: the Southwestern Michigan Area Health Education Center (SMAHEC). SMAHEC was restructured in 1989, with the College of Human Medicine at Michigan State University added as a corporate partner, and reemerged under a new name: Michigan State University Kalamazoo Center for Medical Studies (MSU/KCMS).

In 1994, clinics and administrative offices were consolidated into one location.

The MSU/KCMS Board of Directors approved the merger of the institution into WMed effective July 1, 2012. This merger included clinical education and patient care programs, administrative functions, 223 staff, 200 residents and 61 full-time faculty. Additionally, over 420 community physicians served as clinical faculty, volunteering to provide educational experiences for medical students and residents in their private practices. In 2014, the school welcomed 54 students into its first class.

== Campus and facilities ==
WMed operates out of 6 main locations within Kalamazoo, Michigan and the surrounding area, including facilities within Western Michigan University campuses and other affiliated medical institutions:

- W.E. Upjohn M.D. Campus
- Oakland Drive Campus
- Parkview Campus
- Ascension Borgess Hospital Campus
- Crosstown Parkway Family Medicine Practice
- Family Medicine Residency at Bronson Battle Creek

A division of the Family Medicine Residency program is based at Grace Health and Bronson Battle Creek Hospital in nearby Battle Creek. All other facilities are situated within Kalamazoo city limits.

The W.E. Upjohn M.D. Campus consists of the main medical education facility where direct student instruction occurs. The eight-story facility includes classrooms and lecture halls, a variety of laboratories, the medical library, faculty and administrative offices, a fitness centre, a 22,000 square-foot Simulation Center and the W.E. Upjohn M.D. Campus Auditorium. The labs are located throughout the building and are each specialized for anatomical, procedural, research, or multi-purpose use. The original building was donated to the school in 2011 and has since undergone a series of renovations to further enhance the space.

WMed facilities located within WMU's Oakland Drive and Parkview campuses include ambulatory clinics, residency programs, administrative offices and additional training spaces. The Oakland Drive campus notably houses the Linda Richards Administration Building and attached WMed Health clinics, while the Parkview Campus contains the Innovation Center, an incubator designed to support ventures in life science and engineering disciplines, among others.

Ascension Borgess Hospital is one of two teaching hospitals, the other being Bronson Methodist Hospital, affiliated with WMed residency programs. The Ascension Borgess campus is also home to the WMed Department of Psychiatry.

Crosstown Parkway hosts an ambulatory family medicine practice included in the WMed Department of Family and Community Medicine.

Most of WMed's locations and services are open to patients from the general public to schedule appointments, with the exception of the main educational facility (W.E. Upjohn M.D. Campus) and the Innovation Center (Parkview Campus).

=== W.E. Upjohn M.D. Campus renovations ===
The educational building was originally donated to Western Michigan University in 2011 and underwent a $68 million renovation and expansion project beginning in 2012. The building opened in June 2014 and welcomed its inaugural class on August 18, 2014. A second renovation phase, completed in 2016, added basic science laboratory research space and equipment. In 2019, renovating an unfinished portion of the seventh floor allowed the Department of Pathology to consolidate faculty, staff, laboratories and resources. This consolidation aimed to improve efficiency and address space constraints caused by providing forensic pathology services for multiple Michigan counties. The renovation also provided space for the growth of anatomy education, resident and fellow training, and research activities.

== Accreditation ==
In 2012, WMed was granted preliminary accreditation by the Liaison Committee on Medical Education (LCME), the national accrediting body for educational programs leading to the MD degree. The LCME determined that the medical school met the standards outlined in the LCME document, "Guidelines for New and Developing Medical Schools." This accreditation allowed the medical school to continue its development efforts, recruit students and accept applications for its first class, which began in August 2014. In 2018 WMed was granted full accreditation status by the LCME.

Residency programs at WMed are accredited by the Accreditation Council for Graduate Medical Education (ACGME). WMed's Office of Continuing Education is jointly accredited by the Accreditation Council for Continuing Medical Education (ACCME), the Accreditation Council for Pharmacy Education (ACPE) and the American Nurses Credentialing Center (ANCC), allowing it to provide inter-professional continuing education for healthcare teams.
