= Paula M. Termuhlen =

American surgeon and academic administrator

- Education: Saint Louis University
- Scientific career
- Fields: General surgery
- Workplaces: University of Nebraska Medical Center; Wright State University; Medical College of Wisconsin; University of Minnesota; Western Michigan University

Paula M. Termuhlen is an American surgeon and academic administrator who most recently served as the dean of the Western Michigan University Homer Stryker M.D. School of Medicine.

== Life ==
Termuhlen earned a B.S. (1985) and a M.D. (1989) from the Saint Louis University. She conducted a research fellowship at the MD Anderson Cancer Center in 1993. She completed a general surgery residency in 1995 at the University of Texas Health Science Center at Houston. In 1998, Termuhlen finished a surgical oncology fellowship at the MD Anderson Cancer Center.

Termuhlen was a faculty member at the University of Nebraska Medical Center. She was the director of the general surgery residency at the Boonshoft School of Medicine and the Medical College of Wisconsin. In 2015, she became the regional dean of the Duluth campus of the University of Minnesota Medical School. On May 1, 2021, Termuhlen became the Hal B. Jenson M.D. dean and professor of surgery at the Western Michigan University Homer Stryker M.D. School of Medicine. She was president of the Association of Program Directors in Surgery. She is a member of the Academy of Master Surgeon Educators and a fellow of the American College of Surgeons.
