= Ronda Stryker =

American businesswoman, billionaire

- Born: Ronda E. Stryker; 1954 (age 71–72)
- Education: University of Northern Colorado; Western Michigan University
- Occupations: Director, Stryker Corporation
- Spouse: William Johnston
- Children: 3
- Relatives: Homer Stryker (grandfather); Jon Stryker (brother); Pat Stryker (sister)

Ronda E. Stryker (born 1954) is an American billionaire heiress, a granddaughter of Homer Stryker, the founder of medical equipment manufacturer Stryker Corporation, of which she is a director.

== Early life ==
Ronda Stryker was born in 1954, the daughter of Lee Stryker and his first wife Betty Stryker. Lee was the son of Homer Stryker, the founder of medical equipment manufacturer Stryker Corporation. Lee and his second wife Nancy died when he crashed his plane in Wyoming in 1976. She has two siblings, Patricia and Jon. She has a bachelor's degree from University of Northern Colorado, and a master's from Western Michigan University.

== Career ==
She has been a director of Stryker Corporation for nearly 30 years, as of 2018.

== Personal life ==
She is married to William Johnston, the chairman of Greenleaf Trust, an investment management company that owns shares in Stryker Corporation. They have three children and live in Portage, Michigan. In October 2022, Stryker's son Michael Johnston pled guilty to secretly recording a nanny and her friend.

Stryker is a member of the Harvard Medical School board of fellows. She is a member of the board of trustees of Spelman College, a historically Black, women's liberal arts college in Atlanta, Georgia. In January 2024, it was announced that Stryker and her husband donated $100 million to Spelman College.
