= Poco (chimpanzee) =

Chimpanzee noted for bipedal stance

Poco (also known as Poko) is a chimpanzee who was estimated to be born in 1981. At some stage, he was separated from his mother and sold to end up in a cage to attract customers at a service station in Burundi. In 1989, he was rescued. When he first arrived at the Jane Goodall Institute sanctuary in Bujumbura, Burundi, in 1989, he was weak and malnourished. However, he adjusted and became his group's alpha male. In 1995, due to the civil war in Burundi, he was moved to the Sweetwaters Chimpanzee Sanctuary in Kenya. He is the only chimpanzee noted in the scientific literature who habitually walks bipedality on the ground.

== Bipedality ==
His early life was confined to a narrow parrot cage suspended from the ceiling, which prevented him from walking quadrupedally and climbing, and forced him to stand and walk bipedally. This resulted in permanent back damage, which causes him to walk bipedally. His walking is erect and habitual, though unlike that of humans, he “does not extend the knee far behind the hip joint.” Robin Crompton has commented on his bipedality in the context of the origins of human bipedality.

== See also ==
- List of individual apes

== Bibliography ==
- Hann, Christel (2004) Hugging the Chimps: Adventures in Burundi. AuthorHouse ISBN 978-1418442439
