= Alex Webb (photographer) =

American photographer

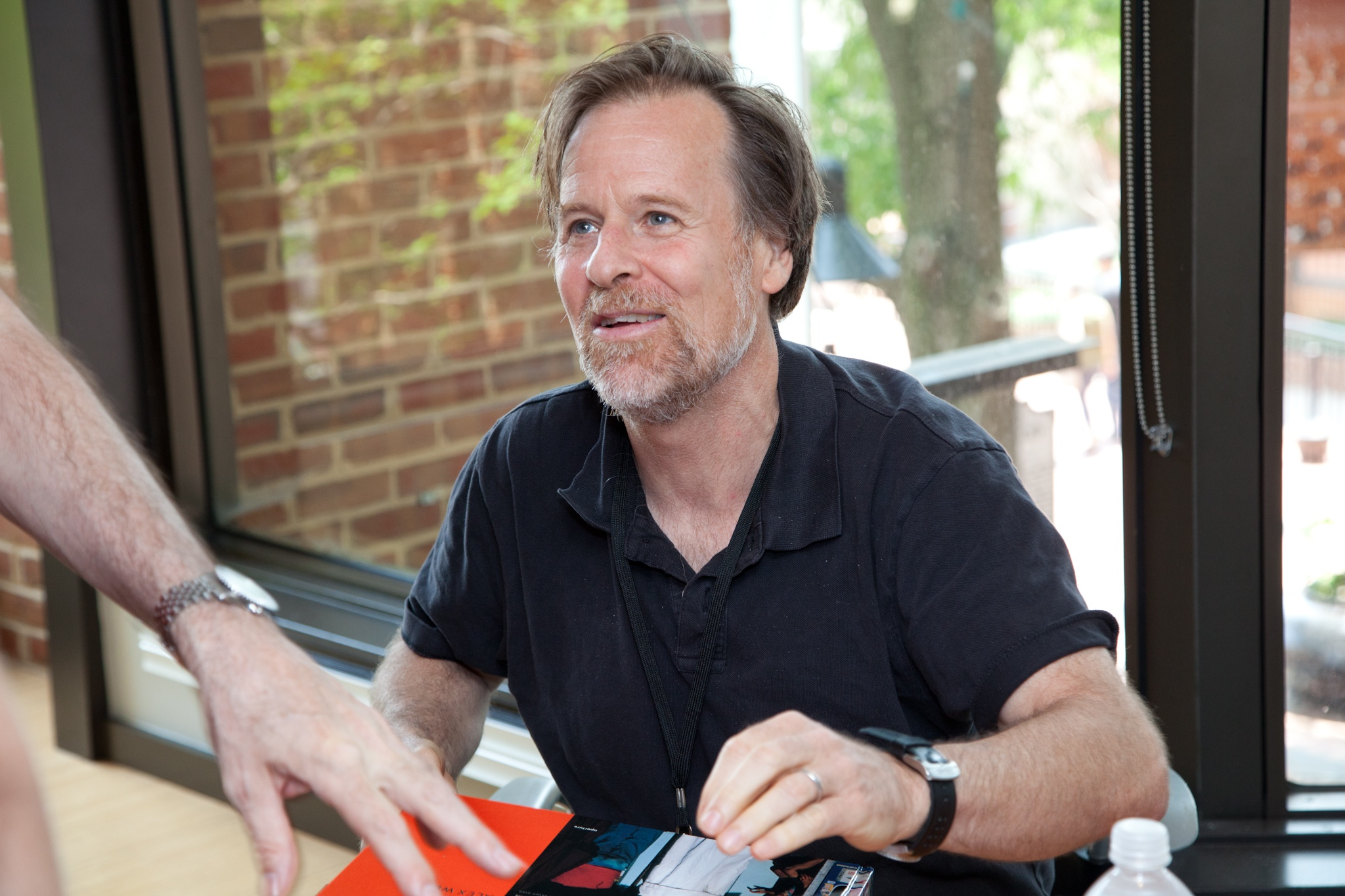
- Alex Webb
- Born: May 5, 1952 (age 74); San Francisco, California, U.S.
- Known for: Photography
- Website: www.webbnorriswebb.co

Alex Webb (born May 5, 1952) is a photographer who makes vibrant and complex color photographs. He has been a member of Magnum Photos since 1979.

Webb's books include Hot Light/Half-Made Worlds (1986), Under a Grudging Sun (1989), From The Sunshine State (1996), Amazon (1997), Crossings (2003), Istanbul (2007), The Suffering of Light (2011), La Calle (2016), as well as with photographer Rebecca Norris Webb, his wife and creative partner—Violet Isle (2009), Memory City (2014), Alex Webb and Rebecca Norris Webb on Street Photography and the Poetic Image (2014), Slant Rhymes (2017), and Brooklyn: The City Within (2019).

He has exhibited at museums worldwide, including the Whitney Museum of Art and the Metropolitan Museum in New York, and the High Museum of Art in Atlanta, Georgia. He was awarded a Guggenheim Fellowship in 2007. He has contributed to Geo, Time, National Geographic, and The New York Times Magazine.

== Career ==
Born in San Francisco, Webb was raised in New England. He became interested in photography as a high school student at The Putney School and in 1972 attended the Apeiron Workshops in Millerton, New York, where he met Magnum photographers Bruce Davidson and Charles Harbutt. Webb went on to study history and literature at Harvard University (graduating in 1974), but also studied photography at the Carpenter Center for the Visual Arts. By 1974 he was working as a photojournalist and in 1976 became an associate member of Magnum Photos. During this time he documented small-town life in the American South. He also did some work in the Caribbean and Mexico, which led him, in 1978, to begin working in color, which he has continued to do.

Webb's work has been exhibited at the Walker Art Center, the Museum of Photographic Arts, the International Center of Photography, the High Museum of Art, the Museum of Contemporary Art in San Diego, and the Whitney Museum of American Art. He has received commissions from the High Museum of Art as well as the Banesto Foundation in Spain.

Webb now lives and works in Brooklyn, New York with his wife, Rebecca Norris Webb, who is also a photographer; they have collaborated on a number of books

== Publications ==
=== Books by Webb ===
- Hot Light/Half-Made Worlds: Photographs from the Tropics, New York: Thames & Hudson, 1986. ISBN 978-0-500-54116-6
- Under a Grudging Sun: Photographs from Haiti Libere, New York: Thames & Hudson, 1989. ISBN 978-0-500-27544-3
- From The Sunshine State: Photographs of Florida, New York: Monacelli Press, Inc., 1996. ISBN 978-1-885254-23-8
- Amazon: From the Floodplains to the Clouds USA: Monacelli Press, Inc., 1997. ISBN 978-1-885254-77-1
- Dislocations, Edition of 40. Massachusetts: Film Study Center at Harvard University, 1998-1999.
- Crossings: Photographs from the U.S.-Mexico Border. New York: Monacelli Press, 2003. ISBN 978-1-58093-096-3. With an essay by Tom Miller.
- Istanbul: City of a Hundred Names. New York: Aperture, 2007. ISBN 978-1-59711-034-1. With Orhan Pamuk.
- The Suffering of Light. New York: Aperture, 2011. ISBN 978-1-59711-173-7
- La Calle. New York, NY: Aperture. 2016. p. 176. ISBN 978-1-59711-371-7.

=== Books paired with Rebecca Norris Webb ===
- Alex Webb and Rebecca Norris Webb, Violet Isle. Santa Fe, NM: Radius, 2009. ISBN 978-1-934435-18-2. With an introduction by Pico Iyer.
- Alex Webb and Rebecca Norris Webb, Memory City. Santa Fe, NM: Radius. 2014. p. 172. ISBN 978-1-934435-76-2.
- Alex Webb and Rebecca Norris Webb on Street Photography and the Poetic Image: The Photography Workshop Series. New York, NY: Aperture. 2014. p. 128. ISBN 978-1-59711-257-4. With an introduction by Teju Cole.
- Alex Webb and Rebecca Norris Webb, Slant Rhymes. Madrid: La Fábrica, 2017. ISBN 978-8416248865.
- Alex Webb and Rebecca Norris Webb, Brooklyn: The City Within. Aperture, 2019. ISBN 978-1597114561.
- Alex Webb and Rebecca Norris Webb, Waves. Santa Fe, NM: Radius. 2022. ISBN 978-1942185963.

=== Publications with contributions by Webb ===
- Endure: Renewal from Ground Zero. New York: Rockefeller Foundation, 2001. ISBN 0891840613. By Webb, Antonín Kratochvíl, Jurek Wajdowicz, Carolina Salguero and Larry Towell.
- Alex Webb Habla Con Max Kozloff, Conversaciones con fotógrafos. Barcelona, Spain: La Fabrica, 2003. ISBN 978-8495471727. Pp. 75.
- Conversations with Contemporary Photographers. New York: Umbrage, 2005. ISBN 978-1884167485. Transcript of a conversation between Webb and Max Kozloff. Pp. 150.
- Contatti. Provini d'Autore = Choosing the best photo by using the contact sheet. Vol. II. Edited by Giammaria De Gasperis. Rome: Postcart, 2013. ISBN 978-88-98391-01-1.
- Home. Tokyo: Magnum Photos Tokyo, 2018. ISBN 978-4-9909806-0-3.

Non-English Language Publications

- Karibik. Hamburg: Mare, 2010. ISBN 978-3866480094. German language version.
- La Sofferenza della Luce. Milan: Contrasto, 2011. ISBN 978-8869652950. Italian language version.
- La Souffrance et la Joie de la Lumière. Paris: Textuel, 2011. ISBN 978-2845974197. French language version.
- Alex Webb and Rebecca Norris Webb, Rimas de Reojo. Madrid: La Fábrica, 2017. ISBN 978-8416248940. Spanish language version.

== Awards ==
- 1988: Leopold Godowsky, Jr. Color Photography Award, Photographic Resource Center (PRC) at Boston University
- 2007: Guggenheim Fellowship from the John Simon Guggenheim Memorial Foundation
- 2019: Recipient of National Endowment for the Arts Grant
