= Jon Stryker =

American architect

- Born: 1958 (age 67–68); Kalamazoo, Michigan, U.S.
- Education: Kalamazoo College (BA); University of California, Berkeley (MArch)
- Occupations: Philanthropist; Activist; President and Founder of the Arcus Foundation
- Spouse: Slobodan Randjelović
- Relatives: Pat Stryker (sister); Ronda Stryker (sister)

Jon Lloyd Stryker (born c. 1958) is an American architect, philanthropist, and billionaire heir to the Stryker Corporation medical technology company fortune. Stryker is the founder and president of the Arcus Foundation, which primarily supports great ape conservation efforts and LGBT social justice, and has awarded over $500 million in grants. The threatened colobine species Rhinopithecus strykeri is named after him. According to Forbes, Stryker's net worth is estimated at $5.3 billion.

== Early life and education ==
Stryker was born in Kalamazoo, Michigan. He is the youngest grandchild of Homer Hartman Stryker, founder of the medical supply company Stryker Corporation. Jon's father, Lee Stryker, died in an airplane crash in 1976.

Stryker earned a Bachelor of Arts degree in biology from Kalamazoo College in 1982. He now serves on the college's Board of Trustees and was the recipient of the college's 2010 Distinguished Service Award.

He also received a Master of Architecture degree from the University of California, Berkeley.

== Career ==
Stryker is a registered architect in Michigan and is president of Depot Landmark LLC, a development company specializing in the rehabilitation of historic buildings.

Stryker is a founding board member of Greenleaf Trust, a privately owned bank in Kalamazoo, Michigan.

Stryker is the founder and president of the Arcus Foundation, a private international philanthropic organization primarily supporting great ape conservation efforts and LGBT causes, as well as other social justice endeavors.

In 2024, Stryker was elected to the American Academy of Arts & Sciences.

== Philanthropy and activism ==
Stryker was named one of the nation's Top 50 donors by the Chronicle of Philanthropy every year from 2006 to 2012 and again in 2014. He was named to Forbes' list of America's Top 50 Givers in 2018.

Speaking to Rockefeller Philanthropy Advisors in 2008, Stryker explained that the Arcus Foundation's two primary areas of focus, while seemingly unrelated, are bound by the common themes of compassion and justice:

Great apes are under huge threat. They are becoming extinct in the wild, and they are being used in the biomedical and entertainment industry then just being thrown away. We don't use the language of animal rights — it's more of a compassion and conservation language. That's one common ground — the compassion side. Another connection is justice. In our work for human rights, we are among those trying to expand traditional ideas of social justice to include sexuality and gender. In our great apes work, we often see a link between economic development for people and ape conservation — social justice for people can truly enable conservation.

In 2016, Jon Stryker and his sister Pat Stryker each gave $5 million to the Equal Justice Initiative to help fund a national memorial to victims of racial lynching in the United States. The siblings made the donation in honor of their late father, Lee Stryker.

In 2017, Stryker donated $1.275 Million to expand Virgin Islands National Park with the purchase of an 11.8-acre property on St. John, U.S. Virgin Islands.

Stryker is a donor of The New York Community Trust, which announced in 2020 that it would donate $75 million to the city's social services and cultural non-profit organizations that were affected by the coronavirus pandemic.

=== LGBT causes ===
Stryker, who is openly gay, is one of the world's leading philanthropic donors to the LGBT community. His Arcus Foundation is the top LGBT-specific grant-making organization in the United States, giving more than $17 million a year to organizations working toward social justice for LGBT people in 2013.

Stryker is a Platinum Council donor (giving US$50,000 or more in annual contributions) to the Gay & Lesbian Victory Fund, a national organization that works to support the candidacies of openly LGBT officials at all levels of government.

In 2015, Stryker spearheaded, together with Jurek Wajdowicz, the ongoing international series of LGBT-themed photography books published by The New Press.

In October 2019, Styker donated $2 million to Spelman College for the first ever queer studies chair at an HBCU (Historically black colleges and universities).

=== Great ape conservation ===
Stryker is one of the leading funders of great ape conservation efforts around the world. Through the Arcus Foundation, Stryker gave more than $10 million in 2013 to support great ape conservation efforts.

Stryker is a founding board member of the Ol Pejeta Wildlife Conservancy, a 90,000-acre not-for-profit wildlife conservancy in central Kenya's Laikipia County. The land, formerly a game reserve and ranching area, was purchased in 2003 by U.K-based conservation organization Fauna and Flora International through a major donation by Stryker's Arcus Foundation.

He is also the co-founder and board chair of Save the Chimps, the world's largest chimpanzee sanctuary located in Fort Pierce, Florida. Stryker funded the purchase of a 190-acre abandoned grapefruit grove in 1997 and oversaw its transformation into a modern sanctuary, which today provides lifetime care for more than 250 chimpanzees rescued from biomedical research laboratories.

Naming of Rhinopithecus strykeri
In 2010, the newly discovered Myanmar snub-nosed monkey was named Rhinopithecus strykeri in Stryker's honor. Stryker's Arcus Foundation supported the primate research teams who discovered the colobine species (already known and hunted for food by natives in northern Myanmar on the Maw River) during the course of a survey of hoolock gibbons.

In 2023, Stryker joined the Jane Goodall Legacy Foundation's Council for Hope.

=== Support of hometown and alma maters ===
Stryker has made significant contributions in the name of conservation and social justice causes to his hometown of Kalamazoo, Michigan, and his alma maters Kalamazoo College and the University of California at Berkeley.

==== UC Berkeley ====
In 2000, Stryker established the Arcus Endowment at the UC Berkeley College of Environmental Design. The endowment supports a wide range of critical and creative activities at the intersection of LGBT issues and urban design and planning. In 2010, Stryker gave an additional $1 million to create a new chair position at the college named the Arcus Chair in Gender, Sexuality and the Built Environment. In 2016, Stryker was named the inaugural recipient of the college's Catherine Bauer Wurster Award for Social Practice. The award honors the legacy of Catherine Bauer Wurster and recognizes the significant achievements of a CED alumnus toward advancing social justice, environmental conservation, and fair urban development.

==== Kalamazoo College ====
In 2009, Stryker's Arcus Foundation awarded a $200,000 planning grant and a $2.1 million project grant to Kalamazoo College to develop a social leadership center on campus. The Arcus Foundation also donated $5 million to cover the construction costs of the 10,000-square-foot building, now called the Arcus Center for Social Justice Leadership. In January 2012, Stryker's foundation awarded a $23 million endowment grant to support the center's operations and programming into the future. The endowment was the largest donation in the college's 182-year history and one of the largest given to any undergraduate institution in the United States for a social justice purpose. Opened in 2014, the center's mission is to support the pursuit of human rights and social justice by developing emerging leaders and sustaining existing leaders in the field of human rights and social justice. The center's modern design has been noted for being "nonhierarchical, open and inclusive" in a reflection of its social justice purpose. It was described as a "log cabin the Jetsons ordered from the 2062 Whole Earth Catalog" and "laudable simply for being eloquent and humane," in a 2014 New York Times architectural review. The building was designed by Jeanne Gang of the Chicago-based firm Studio Gang Architects.

Stryker also makes contributions in support of the college's study abroad programs and enrollment diversity efforts. In 2008, he established a $5.6 million grant to fund the tuition and financial support of 50 Posse Scholars from the Los Angeles Unified School District. The grant, which supported the enrollment of 10 Posse Scholars in five consecutive academic classes at Kalamazoo College, was made in partnership with the Posse Foundation, a national organization that pairs high-performing public high school students from underrepresented groups in higher education with full, four-year academic scholarships at colleges and universities throughout the country. In 2001, Stryker made a $5 million grant in support of the college's highly ranked study abroad programs.

In 2018, Stryker donated $20 million to Kalamazoo College to establish a 10-year scholarship program for students of color, first-generation students and those from lower-income families. He has donated $66 million to the college in total. For his efforts, Stryker received Kalamazoo College's 2010 Distinguished Service Award, which goes to alumni who have made exceptional personal contributions to the college.

==== Kalamazoo Nature Center ====
In 2015, Stryker donated 22-acres of land running along the west fork of Portage Creek in Kalamazoo, Michigan, to the Kalamazoo Nature Center. In addition to the land donation, Stryker committed to giving as much as $700,000 as part of a 2-to-1 matching grant that would go toward a proposed multi-phase restoration of the property and an environmental education facility on the site. As a condition of the donation, several conservation easements were placed on the property to ensure that the land remains protected and accessible to the public in perpetuity.

==== Western Michigan University ====
In 2021, Stryker and his husband, Slobodan Randjelovic, donated five million dollars for student scholarships to Western Michigan University Homer Stryker M.D. School of Medicine in Kalamazoo. Previously, Stryker donated to the school's L. Lee Stryker Learning Hall, named for his father, and the Stryker family played a critical role in funding the medical school, which is named to honor Stryker's grandfather, Dr. Homer Stryker.

=== Art museums ===
In 2017, Stryker joined the board of trustees of The Museum of Modern Art in New York City.

From 2018 to 2021, Stryker served on the board of the Museum of Contemporary Art in Los Angeles.

=== Political contributions ===
In August 2006, Stryker formed the political action committee Coalition for Progress to fund the election campaigns of Michigan Senate and Michigan House of Representatives district candidates, particularly from the Democratic Party. Stryker personally contributed $4.7 million to the PAC.

The Coalition for Progress paid for significant advertising in the 2006 Michigan gubernatorial election in support of Jennifer Granholm, who was re-elected as Governor of Michigan over Republican opponent Dick DeVos.

In August 2012, Stryker donated $325,000 to the nonprofit group Freedom to Marry Minnesota, which helped to organize the defeat of a referendum that would have placed a state constitutional ban on same-sex marriage in Minnesota. In 2013, Minnesota became the 12th state to legalize same-sex marriage in the United States.

== Personal life ==
Stryker married his long-time partner Slobodan Randjelović in December 2016. He has two children from a previous marriage.

He lives in New York City and maintains a home in New York state's Hudson River Valley.

He previously owned a Mediterranean-style house in Palm Beach, Florida, designed by famed American architect Marion Sims Wyeth. The house, built in 1924, features a west-facing facade that has been designated a historic landmark since 1990. In June 2010, Stryker expanded the property where the house sits by purchasing an adjoining ocean-access lot that included the former residence of Jimmy Buffett and Jane Buffett for $18.5 million.

Stryker also owns multiple properties in his native Kalamazoo, and is credited with built-space revitalization efforts in the city. He unknowingly purchased the commercial building that once housed his grandfather's Orthopedic Frame Co., which eventually became Stryker Corp., before learning of the building's origins in 2003.

Stryker maintains a home in Garrison, New York, along the Hudson River. In June 2013, Stryker purchased the 129-acre property and placed it under a conservation easement to protect against any future development of the riverfront land. The property's parking area and extensive network of trails, including on-foot access to the Hudson River, is managed by the Open Space Institute and is open to the public, with the exception of a 21-acre residential area.

He briefly owned an apartment in the Time Warner Center in New York City's Columbus Circle before selling it in 2007.

== Awards and honors ==
- 2008—Creating Change Award, National LGBTQ Task Force
- 2012—Jeanne and Joseph Sullivan Award, Heartland Alliance's National Immigrant Justice Center
- 2014—Global Vision Award, Immigration Equality, a U.S.-based nonprofit organization that provides legal representation to LGBT and HIV-positive asylum seekers, detainees, and binational couples.
- 2015—Visionary Award, Gay Lesbian & Straight Education Network
- 2017—Patron of Nature, International Union for Conservation of Nature
