= Coalition for Progress =

Political action committee in Michigan, US

Formed in 2006, the Coalition for Progress was an independent statewide American non-profit, progressive or liberal 527 political action committee in Michigan with more than 40,000 members, focused on electing progressives to the Michigan state legislature. Primarily funded by Jon Stryker, the Coalition for Progress was the largest PAC in Michigan's history. After 2010, the Coalition for Progress had disappeared.
