= Michel Fingesten =

Czech painter (1884–1943)

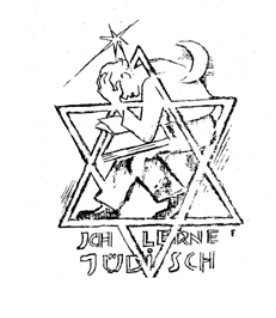
Ich lerne Jüdisch ('I'm learning Jewish', 1936)

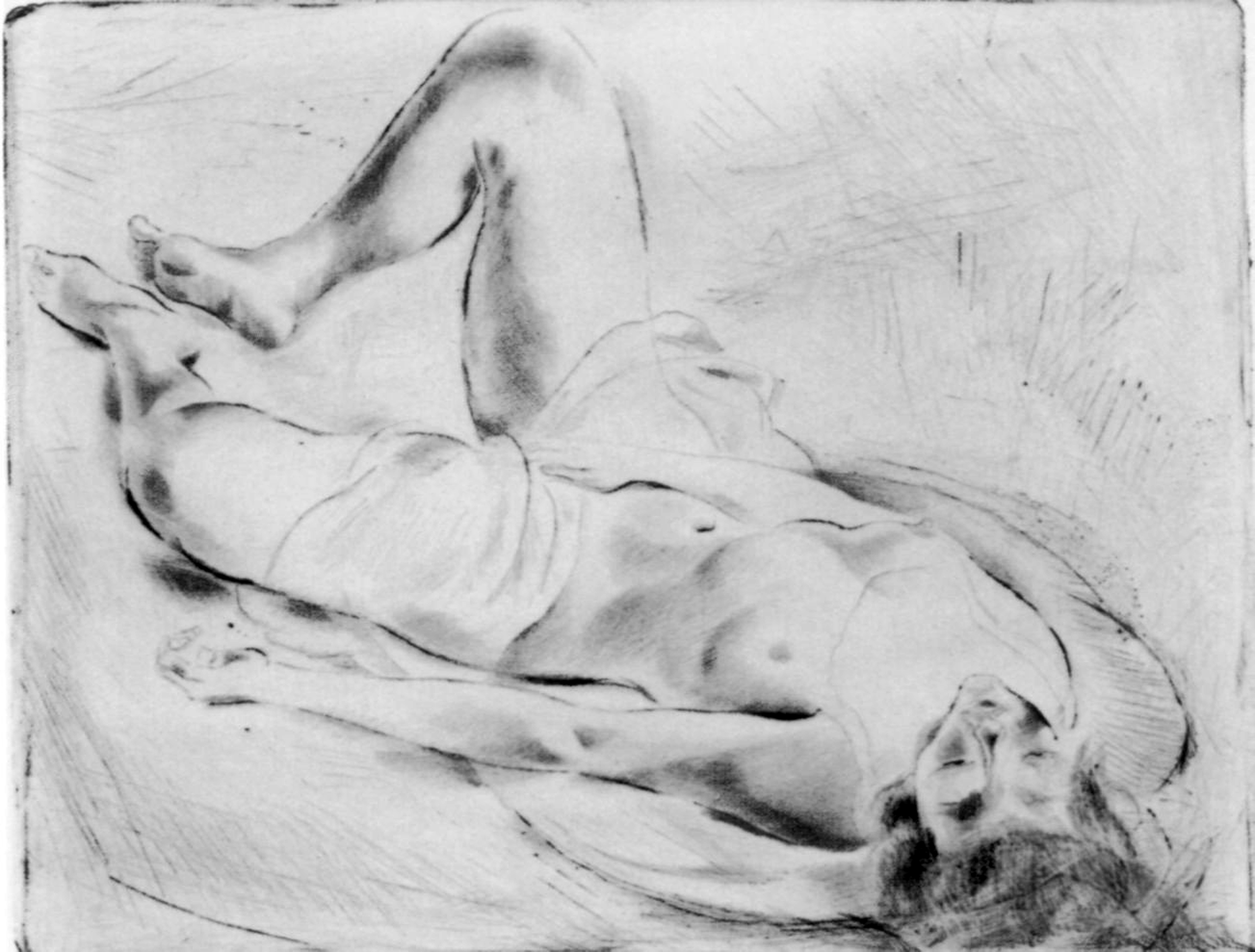

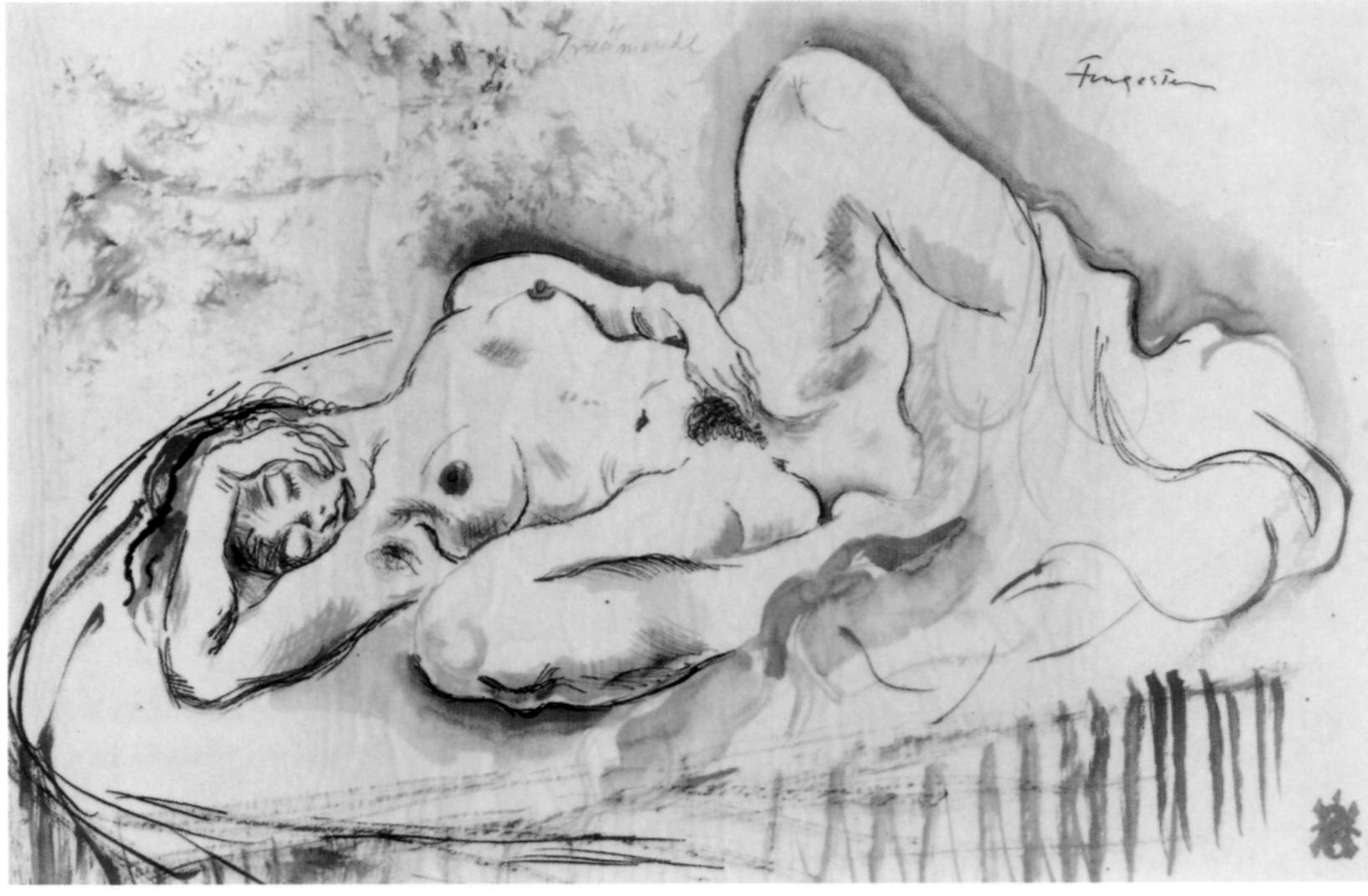
Improvisationen über das Thema Liebe ('Improvisations on the theme of Love'), put together by Fingesten in 1923 especially for the collector Heinrich Stinnes.

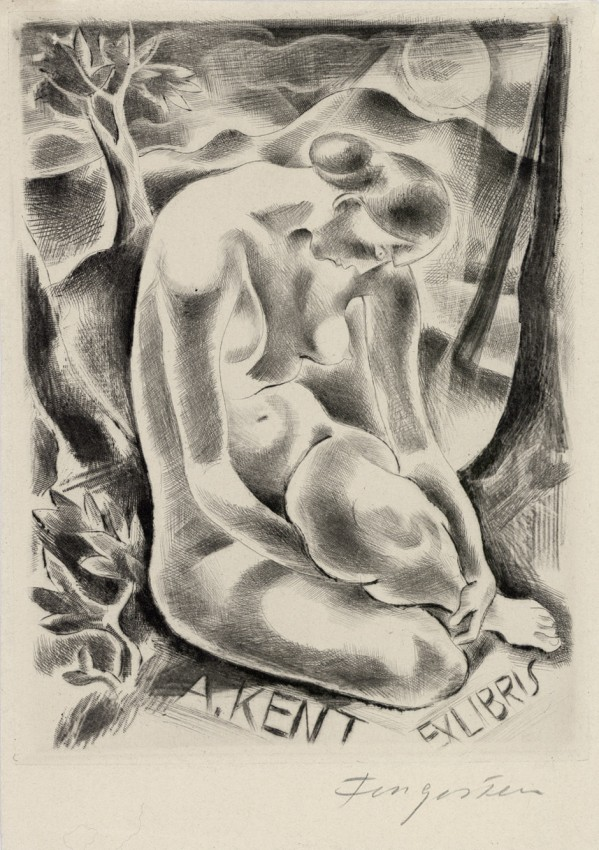
A. Kent Ex Libris (before 1939)

Michel Fingesten (né Michl Finkelstein; 18 April 1884 – 8 October 1943) was a Czech-Austrian painter and graphic artist of Jewish descent. He was one of the most original and prolific graphic artists and bookplates designers of the twentieth century. According to the Italian journalist and critic Giampiero Mughini, "Fingesten is to the history of the ex libris as Pablo Picasso is to that of painting".

== Life ==
Michel Fingesten was born Michl Finkelstein on 18 April 1884 in the village of Buczkowice (Buczkowitz), Kingdom of Galicia and Lodomeria, in the Austro-Hungarian Empire (now part of the Republic of Poland), to the weaver Leon Finkelstein, a Czech-Austrian of Jewish descent, and Franziska Lion, a Jewess from Trieste (then also under Austrian rule).

In 1900, at the age of 16, he left to study at the Art Academy in Vienna, where Oskar Kokoschka was studying at the same time, but left after only two years. From 1902 to 1906 he undertook a trip around the world, travelling to America,—where he spent four years and witnessed the 1906 earthquake in San Francisco,—and thence to China and Australia.

In 1907 he returned to Europe, arriving in Palermo. From Palermo he crossed the entire Italian peninsula and travelled to Germany via Trieste. Fingesten then stayed temporarily in Munich, where he undertook studies in Franz von Stuck's studio. During this time he was mainly concerned with small-format graphics and drawing caricatures. He finally settled in Berlin in 1913, and there concentrated on mastering the technique of etching.

In December 1914 he married the buyer Bianka, née Schick. The marriage ended in divorce in 1932. In 1916 his son, the sculptor Peter Fingesten, was born. In 1922 he was busy with the scenes of the silent films Die Schuhe einer schönen Frau and Don Juan of the Vera-Filmwerke.

In 1935 he returned to Italy to visit his family in Trieste. Because of the increasingly intensified racial policy of the National Socialists, he stayed in Italy and settled in Milan. During this time he engraved around 500 bookplates or ex-libris, including one in 1936 for Gabriele D'Annunzio.

In 1937, Fingesten's works were confiscated as part of the degenerate art campaign in Germany. On 9 October 1940, he was arrested and interned as a foreigner in the camps of Civitella del Tronto and Ferramonti di Tarsia near Cosenza. He was only able to leave the camp after the Allies liberated southern Italy.

After his liberation from the concentration camp, he met the pastor of Bisignano, Don Giuseppe Savaglia, who commissioned him to paint a picture after a santino, a small figurine of a saint. Fingesten completed the painting within a week. This picture is significant not only because it was the painter's last work, but because towards the end of his life he returned to painting, which he had abandoned years earlier in favour of his bookplates.

Fingesten died of an infection following a surgical procedure in Cerisano, Calabria on 8 October 1943, a few days after it was liberated by the British Army.

== Works ==
The following works were confiscated in 1937 in the degenerate art campaign:

- Selbstbildnis ('Self-portrait'), watercolour; Berlin.
- Die Trinker ('The Drinker'), etching, 1919; Kunsthütte Chemnitz.
- In der Kaschemme ('In the run-down pub'), etching; Museum der bildenden Künste.
- Das bibliophile Eselein ('The little donkey bibliophile'), etching; Staatliche Graphische Sammlung München.
