= Save the Chimps =

United States chimpanzee sanctuary

- Interactive map of Save the Chimps
- 27.4652°N 80.5882°W; 32.8801°N 105.9754°W
- Date opened: 1997
- Location: Fort Pierce, Florida, US
- Land area: 150 acres
- No. of animals: >261
- No. of species: Common chimpanzee Pan troglodytes
- Website: Save The Chimps.org

Save the Chimps, Inc is a 501(c)(3) nonprofit American sanctuary specializing in the care of chimpanzees. The organization was founded by Carole C. Noon in 1997 with support from Jon Stryker of the Arcus Foundation. Save the Chimps is accredited by the Global Federation of Animal Sanctuaries (GFAS) and a founding member of the North American Primate Sanctuary Alliance. The mission of Save the Chimps is to provide sanctuary and exemplary care to chimpanzees in need. Since opening, the sanctuary has saved over 300 chimpanzees (chimpadmin, n.d.-b).

The majority of the chimpanzees at Save the Chimps live in large social groups on 12 separate three-acre islands located on 150 acres in a rural area of Fort Pierce, Florida. As a GFAS sanctuary, Save the Chimps is not open to the public but holds occasional events for members.

Carole Noon founded Save the Chimps in 1997 in a bid to retire the U.S. Air Force chimps, who had been put up for auction. After losing her bid to the Coulston Foundation, a biomedical research lab, Noon sued the Air Force and settled out of court for custody of 21 out of the 140 chimps. Coulston eventually lost its NIH funding due to repeated violations of the Animal Welfare Act and filed for bankruptcy in 2002. Save the Chimps acquired all of Coulston's 266 chimpanzees, representing the single largest rescue of chimpanzees in history and transforming Save the Chimps into the world's largest chimpanzee sanctuary.

Save the Chimps was featured in episode 4 of the 2024 HBO documentary series Chimp Crazy as the new home of Tonka, a chimp who had been rented out for Hollywood films and used to breed chimpanzee pets.
