= Maasai Cricket Warriors =

Kenyan cricket team

The Maasai Cricket Warriors (MCW) is a Kenyan men's cricket team formed in 2007 by semi-nomadic people from Laikipia County. Consisting of 25 players and a counterpart women's team, it participates in semi-professional tournaments aboard, including in London primarily focused on raising funds and awareness through charity cricket and uses its athletic fame for the promotion of women's rights, campaign against female genital mutilation, child marriage, substance abuse, and environmental conservation in Kenya.

Captained by Sonyanga Ole Ngais, it is the only and the first cricket team formed in the history of the Maasai community. The tribe is known for lion hunting, a rite of coming of age. They left hunting after learning cricket.

== Background ==
The MCW was originally introduced to cricket by Aliya Bauer, a South African primatologist. Bauer noticed the group when she was conducting research in Il Polei village. She purchased equipment and taught them cricket. The semi-nomadic group found the game interesting after realizing it looks similar to their traditional hunting and spear-throwing.

In 2012, they moved to Mombasa where they learnt cricket at the Legends Cricket Nursery under the coaching of Steve Tikolo, Thomas Odoyo, and Jimmy Kamande. Their participation in 2013 Last Man Stands championship, London caught attention of their elders (head of Maasai tribe) that subsequently became a subject of discussion with elders about women's rights in Kenya.

In 2017 the MCW also appeared in an awareness campaign for the protection of the northern white rhinoceros after it participated in a charity cricket tournament, Last male Standing Rhino Cup against the British Army Training Unit Kenya cricket team.

== Clothing and equipments ==
The MCW players wanted to play cricket wearing their traditional dresses of red color, bracelets, traditional guard around the body, and sandals made from recycled tires during their 2012 tour of South Africa for Last Man Stands Championship, Twenty20. Besides wearing pads and batting gloves, players also wear traditional dress of Maasai, red shawls and jewels. Players often wear coloured bead-necklace during matches.

== Fundraising ==
The International Cricket Council (ICC) provided financial aid to the team in the late 2010 for World AIDS Day tournament. It also received financial assistance from the Cricket Without Boundaries, Last Man Stand, 28Too Many British Army Training Unit Kenya, International cricket Council for safeguarding cricket. among many other organizations.

== MCW in films ==
In 2015, a documentary titled Warriors was created by a British film director, Barney Douglas. The film consists of a detailed account of the team, as well as their fight against the practice of female genital mutilation.
