= Coulston Foundation =

Research facility in New Mexico, US

The Coulston Foundation (TCF) was a research facility established by the toxicologist Fred Coulston in 1993 at Alamogordo, New Mexico. At one point, the foundation may have had 650 chimpanzees and conducted research on AIDS and hepatitis C and other diseases.

Antivivisection groups investigated the facility over a number of years uncovering numerous cases of animal abuse and violations of the Animal Welfare Act. By 2001, the lab had lost its government contracts because of concerns over the welfare of the animals. In December of that year, the foundation was unable to pay its bills and the local bank began foreclosure proceedings.

In September 2002, the foundation was purchased by Save the Chimps, which ceased all research and retired the animals.
