= Stryker Corporation =

American medical technology company

- Type: Public
- Traded as: NYSE: SYK; S&P 500 component
- Industry: Health technology
- Founded: 1941; 85 years ago
- Founder: Homer Stryker
- Headquarters: Portage, Michigan, US; Newbury, Berkshire, UK
- Key people: Kevin A. Lobo (chairman and CEO); Timothy J. Scannell (president and COO); Ronda Stryker (director)
- Products: Medical devices; orthopaedic implants; surgical equipment; neurovascular products; patient handling; emergency medical equipment
- Revenue: ▲US$25.12 billion (2025)
- Operating income: ▲US$4.89 billion (2025)
- Net income: ▲US$3.25 billion (2025)
- Total assets: ▲US$47.84 billion (2025)
- Total equity: ▲US$22.42 billion (2024)
- Owner: John W. Brown (5.3%); Ronda Stryker (4.6%); Jon Stryker; Pat Stryker
- Number of employees: 53,000 (2024)
- Website: stryker.com

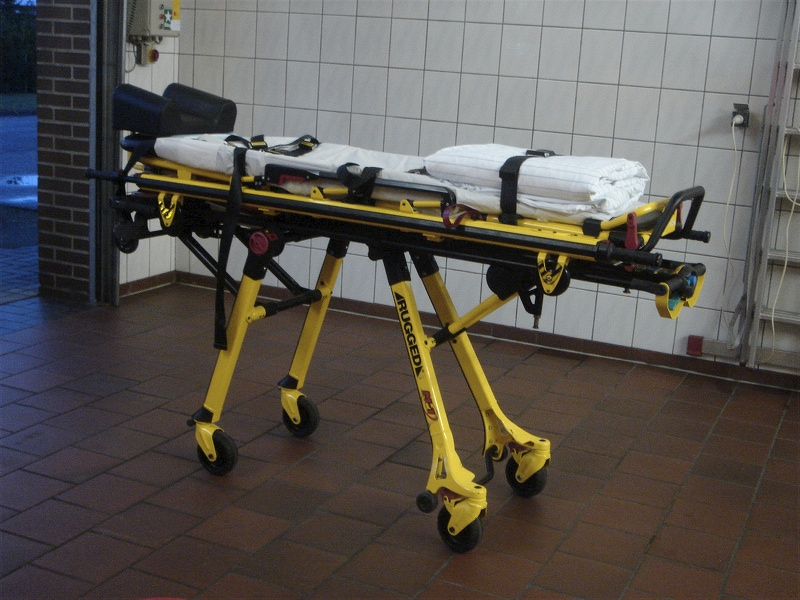
Stryker Roll-In-Stretcher

Stryker Corporation is an American multinational medical technologies corporation based in Portage, Michigan, United States. The company's products are used for medical surgery and neurotechnology (60% of 2024 revenues), which include surgical equipment, patient and caregiver safety technologies, endoscopy systems, and patient handling, emergency medical equipment, and intensive care disposable products, as well as neurosurgical, neurovascular and oral and maxillofacial surgery implant products; and orthopedic surgery (40% of 2024 revenues), which includes implants used in total joint replacements, such as hip, knee and shoulder, and trauma and extremities surgeries. Stryker's products are sold in over 75 countries and are used by 150 million patients annually. In 2024, 75% of the company's revenues came from the United States.

The company is ranked 195th on the Fortune 500 and 331st on the Forbes Global 2000.

== History ==
In 1941, The Orthopedic Frame Company was founded by Homer Stryker, an orthopedist from Kalamazoo, Michigan. Stryker developed the Turning Frame, a mobile hospital bed that allowed for repositioning of injured patients while providing necessary body immobility; the cast cutter, a cast cutting apparatus that removed cast material without damaging underlying tissues; and the walking heel, among others. In 1964, the company name was changed to Stryker Corporation.

In 1977, John W. Brown joined as president and CEO and became chairman in 1981. He transitioned to chairman in 2003. In 2009, Brown retired as chairman after 32 years with the company. Under his leadership, revenues rose from $17 million to $6.7 billion.

In 1979, Stryker became a public company via an initial public offering.

In 2003, Stephen P. MacMillan joined Stryker as president and CEO.

In 2007, Stryker sold its Physiotherapy Associates division to private equity firm Water Street Healthcare Partners for $150 million.

In 2007 and 2008, the company received three FDA warning letters citing issues in compliance. The first of these, a seven-page correspondence, named various issues at an Irish manufacturing facility, such as untimely fix of failures and procedural noncompliance in the testing of failed or otherwise problem-prone devices. The second, sent November 2007, cited issues at the firm's Mahwah, New Jersey, facility, including poor fixation of hip implant components, in some instances requiring mitigation by revision surgeries; exceeded microbial level violations in the cleaning and final packaging areas of the sterile implants; and failure to institute measures in prevention of recurrence of these and other problems. The third warning letter, sent April 2008, cited issues at the firm's biotechnology facility in Hopkinton, Massachusetts related to quality and noncompliance including falsification of documents relevant to the selling of products to hospitals which are to be sold under a limited, government-mandated basis. Stryker maintains that employees involved in the falsification of documents have since been terminated.

In August 2010, the company paid $1.35 million to settle claims that it marketed items without regulatory approval and misled health care providers about the use of its products.

Stryker initiated a product recall on several models of medical vacuums sold under the Neptune Waste Management System brand in June and September 2012. The devices, some of which had not been cleared by the Food and Drug Administration, caused a fatal accident when the vacuum was mistakenly used to suction a passive drainage tube.

In 2012, the FDA issued a warning for the Stryker Rejuvenate hip replacement after it was discovered that the hip replacement was considered defective and could cause similar side effects to DePuy Synthes hip implants. As a result, in 2014, Stryker was fined $1 billion and $2.5 billion, respectively, for its defective Rejuvenate and ABG II hip replacements that can cause excruciating pain.

In February 2012, MacMillan resigned and Curt R. Hartman was named interim chief executive officer, vice-president and chief financial officer. William U. Parfet was named non-executive chairman of the board. In October 2012, Kevin A. Lobo was appointed as president and chief executive officer.

In 2013, the company agreed to pay $13.2 million to settle charges that it made illicit payments totaling approximately $2.2 million in Argentina, Greece, Mexico, Poland, and Romania. In 2018, the company was fined $7.8 million under the Foreign Corrupt Practices Act for failing to detect the risk of improper payments in sales of products in India, China, and Kuwait.

In 2016, subsidiary company Stryker EMEA Supply Chain Services BV challenged the Dutch authorities' interpretation of procurement nomenclature regarding implant screws intended to be inserted in the human body. The matter was referred to the European Court of Justice for a preliminary ruling on the legal position and on the validity of the relevant EU implementing regulation.

Stryker is among companies that continue business-as-usual in Russia during the 2022 Russian invasion of Ukraine despite international sanctions during the Russian invasion of Ukraine. Research from Yale School of Management evaluating companies' reaction to the Russian invasion put Stryker in the "Grade F" category of "Digging In", meaning "Defying Demands for Exit or Reduction of Activities."

In 2023, Stryker introduced a minimally invasive bunion treatment system, Prostep MIS Lapidus, which aims to reduce bunion recurrence, minimize scarring, and lower opioid use.

On 11 March 2026, during the 2026 Iran war, the Handala Hack Team issued a remote wipe of company computers using Microsoft Intune. This attack was reported to delay surgeries for some patients. In the first week of April, Stryker reported to be fully operational again.

Acquisitions
Date	Company	Value	Description	References
1979	Osteonics	Undisclosed	Entrance to the replacement hip, knee, and other orthopedic implants market	
1981	SynOptics	Undisclosed	Entrance to endoscopy business	
1998	Howmedica	$1.9 billion	Orthopaedic division of Pfizer; Howmedica became Stryker Orthopaedics	
August 2000	Guided Technologies	Undisclosed	Developer and manufacturer of optical localizers	
July 2002	Spinal Implant Business of Surgical Dynamics	$135 million		
August 2004	SpineCore	$120 million	Development of artificial spinal disks	
February 2005	eTrauma.com	$50 million	Development of software for Picture archiving and communication system (PACS)	
March 2006	Sightline Technologies	$50 million	Manufacturer of gastrointestinal endoscopy apparatuses; partially closed in 2008	
January 2006	PlasmaSol	$17.5 million	Technologies allowing sterilization of various MedSurg equipments	
December 2009	Ascent Healthcare Solutions	$525 million	Reprocessing and remanufacturing of medical devices in the United States	
January 2011	Neurovascular Division of Boston Scientific	$1.5 billion	Products used for the minimally invasive treatment of hemorrhagic and ischemic stroke	
June 2011	Orthovita	Undisclosed	A biomaterials company specializing in bone augmentation and substitution technologies.	
July 2011	Memometal Technologies	$162 million	Manufactures and markets products for extremity indications based on its proprietary methods for preparing and manufacturing a shape memory metal alloy	
August 2011	Concentric Medical	$135 million	Devices for the removal of thrombus in patients experiencing acute ischemic stroke along with a broad range of AIS access products	
November 2012	Surpass Medical	$135 million	Flow diversion stent technology to treat brain aneurysms using a mesh design and delivery system	
March 2013	Trauson Holdings	$764 million	Trauma manufacturer in China	
December 2013	MAKO Surgical Corp.	$1.65 billion	Surgical robotic arm assistance platforms, most notably the RIO (Robotic Arm Interactive Orthopedic System) as well as orthopedic implants used by orthopedic surgeons for use in partial knee and total hip arthroplasty	
March 2014	Patient Safety Technologies	$85 million	Safety-Sponge System, an integrated counting and documentation system that prevents surgical sponges and towels from being unintentionally left in patients after surgical procedures	
March 2014	Pivot Medical	Undisclosed	Products for hip arthroscopy	
April 2014	Berchtold Holding AG	$172 million	Surgical tables, equipment booms, and surgical lighting systems	
July 2014	Small Bone Innovations	$358 million	Products that help surgeons treat and replace small bones and joints	
September 2015	Muka Metal	Undisclosed	Manufactures hospital beds and patient furniture in Kayseri, Turkey	
February 2016	Sage Products	$2.78 billion	Disposable device maker	
February 2016	Physio-Control	$1.28 billion	Maker of defibrillators	
June 2017	Arthrogenx	Undisclosed	Cobra reusable suture passer for arthroscopic rotator cuff repair	
September 2017	Novadaq	$701 million	Fluorescence imaging systems	
October 2017	Vexim	€183 million	Minimally invasive treatment of vertebral fractures	
December 2017	Entellus Medical	$662 million	Minimally invasive products for the treatment of various ENT diseases	
May 2018	Hygia Health Services	Undisclosed	Reprocessing of patient care single-use devices	
June 2018	SafeAir AG	Undisclosed	Surgical smoke evacuation	
September 2018	Invuity	$190 million	Surgical lighting company	
October 2018	HyperBranch Medical Technology	$220 million	Maker of Adherus AutoSpray dural sealant	
November 2018	K2M Group Holdings	$1.4 billion	Spinal surgery device-maker	
February 2019	Arrinex	Undisclosed	Manufacturer of cryoablation technology for the treatment of chronic rhinitis	
March 2019	OrthoSpace	$220 million	Rotator cuff implant	
October 2019	Mobius Imaging and GYS Tech	$370 million	Intra-operative imaging; plus up to $130 million in contingent payments	
November 2020	Wright Medical Group	$5.4 billion	Upper-body implants	
January 2021	OrthoSensor	Undisclosed	Sensor technology for use in total joint replacement procedures	
April 2021	TMJ Concepts	Undisclosed	Patient-specific implants for TMJ reconstruction	
September 2021	Gauss Surgical	Undisclosed	Platform for real-time monitoring of blood loss during surgery	
January 2022	Vocera Communications	$2.97 billion	Digital patient-outreach tools	
March 2024	SERF SAS	Undisclosed	Joint replacements	
September 2024	Care.ai	Undisclosed	Artificial intelligence-based tools for hospitals	
September 2024	NICO Corporation	Undisclosed	Minimally invasive solutions for brain tumor removal and stroke care	
February 2025	Inari Medical	$4.9 billion	Catheter-based mechanical thrombectomy systems to treat vascular disease	
May 2026	Amplitude Vascular Systems	$835 million	Intravascular Lithotripsy (IVL) for peripheral arterial disease	
