= Peter Fingesten =

American sculptor

Peter Fingesten (March 20, 1916 in Berlin, Germany – September 10, 1987) was a German-born American graphic artist, sculptor, and founding chairman of the Art Department at Pace University.

== Biography ==
Peter Fingesten, son of Michel Fingesten (1884-1943) an artist, was hired by Pace University in the 1950s to bring a liberal arts sector to what was then only a business school. Fingesten was a scholar in symbolism, exhibited his works of art in the style of surrealism, and lectured on a number of topics pertaining to art. His talent as an artist and excellence as a revered teacher propelled him to becoming a fully tenured professor. His trademark curved pipe, that he always carried with him, made him an easily recognized New York iconoclast. He continued to show his work in New York art galleries but was most involved in propelling Pace University in the City of New York to prominence. In gratitude, the Pace University founded The Peter Fingestin Gallery in his honor, and this gallery has and continues to hold frequent showing of noted artists.

Fingesten married Carole Cacace, a student of his many art and architecture classes. They were always recognized by their style of dress, each of them with the same custom-made clothing, and the "knicker and barret" outfits. Theirs was a romance of 'first order' that so many of their friends admired.

== Bibliography ==
- Fingesten, Peter, East Is East: Hinduism, Buddhism, Christianity: A Comparison. Muhlenberg Press. 1956.
- Fingesten, Peter, Basic Facts of Art History. Collier Books. 1963.
- Fingesten, Peter, The Eclipse of Symbolism. Univ of South Carolina Press. 1970. ISBN 0-87249-172-2.
- Fingesten, Peter, Dynamics of Creativity: For Artists and Lovers of Art. Wyndham Hall Press. 1988. ISBN 1-55605-005-4.
