= Gail Furman =

American psychologist

- Born: Gail Gorman; 1946; Queens, New York, U.S.
- Died: April 17, 2019 (aged 72–73)
- Education: University of Michigan (BA); New York University (PhD)
- Spouse: Jay Furman (divorced)
- Children: Jason Furman; Jesse Furman

Gail Furman (1946 – 2019) was an American psychologist and political donor. Furman was president of the Furman Foundation, Inc. The foundation is a major donor to the Tides Center and the Media Matters for America, a left-leaning center for journalism founded by author David Brock.

== Early life and education ==
Furman was born in 1946 to a Jewish family in Queens, New York, the daughter of Martha and David Gorman. Her mother was a performer who used the stage name Marny Frances. She graduated from the University of Michigan and held a PhD in psychology from New York University.

== Career ==
Furman worked as a psychologist at the Fieldston School and the Dalton School from 1973 until 1990.

In December 2003, Furman attended a gathering in New York City organized by Erica Payne in order to watch a screening of Democracy Alliance founder Rob Stein's PowerPoint presentation, The Conservative Message Machine Money Matrix. After the presentation, Furman agreed in front of the group to donate more than $25,000 to fund Stein to conduct a research project to determine "what kind of groups the Left needed to fund."

At the second meeting of the Democracy Alliance in October 2005, Furman "demanded to know why the alliance wasn't creating a 'nerve center' that could book progressives on TV news shows."

Furman along with George Soros and other Democracy Alliance members John R. Hunting; Paul Rudd (co-founder of Adaptive Analytics); Pat Stryker; Nicholas Hanauer; ex-Clinton administration official Rob Stein; Drummond Pike; real estate developer Robert Bowditch; Pioneer Hybrid International-heir and congressional candidate Scott Wallace; Susie Tompkins Buell; real estate developer Albert Dwoskin; and Taco Bell-heir Rob McKay, funded the Secretary of State Project, an American non-profit, 527 political action committee focused on electing reform-minded progressive Secretaries of State in battleground states, who typically oversee the election process. The Alliance was critical in getting California Secretary of State Debra Bowen and Minnesota Secretary of State Mark Ritchie re-elected.

== Personal life ==
She was married to real estate developer Jay Furman; they had two children: Barack Obama's chief economic advisor Jason Furman and federal judge Jesse Furman. They later divorced.
