= Susie Tompkins Buell =

American entrepreneur and businesswoman

- Born: Susan Russell; 1943 (age 82–83)
- Known for: Founder of Esprit
- Political party: Democratic
- Spouses: Doug Tompkins (m. 1964; div. 1989) Mark Buell (m. 1996)

Susie Tompkins Buell (née Russell; born 1943) is an American entrepreneur, businesswoman and a donor to progressive causes. Tompkins Buell co-founded the Esprit clothing and the North Face brand with her first husband, Doug Tompkins whom she met when she picked him up while he was hitchhiking. She is also noted for her close friendship with Bill and Hillary Clinton and her status as a Democratic Party mega-donor.

== Early life ==
Susie Tompkins Buell was born Susan Russell in San Francisco in 1943, to parents Clarabelle and Floyd Russell. Her father was a "betting commissioner" and worked in real estate. In childhood, her family had a second home in Bolinas, which had a profound impact on her love of the natural world.

She attended primary school at the Convent School of the Sacred Heart, Ojai Valley School, and Miss Burke’s School. For high school, she attended Lowell High School in the class of 1960 but she did not graduate.

== Career ==
=== Plain Jane ===
In 1968, Tompkins Buell and Jane Tise co-founded the Plain Jane clothing label. Initially Buell and Tise sold dresses to small clothing shops from the back of their Volkswagen van. Tompkins Buell's then-husband Doug Tompkins, whom she had married in 1964 after the pair met while hitchhiking, joined the company to work on the business side and he put up funds to cover the cost of garment factory production. Plain Jane was making $2 million a year by 1970. Tompkins had recommended changing the name Plain Jane to Esprit de Corp.

=== Esprit de Corp ===
By 1986, the global clothing brand had reached $800 million in sales. The Tompkinses divorced in 1989.

In 1990, Tompkins Buell led a leveraged buyout that gained her control of the company, and netted her an estimated $150 million. Esprit emerged from the buyout so deeply in debt that in less than two years it went into technical default on its outstanding loans. In 1997, CEO Jay Margolis banned Tompkins Buell and all members of her family from entering Esprit's headquarters. Also in 1997, Tompkins Buell filed a lawsuit against Esprit, seeking about $4 million in reimbursements from the company for tax payments she made after selling much of her stake in the company to investors.

== Democratic Party and activism ==
Tompkins Buell is often described as Hillary Clinton's soul mate. She led Clinton's fundraising efforts for 2008 in the San Francisco Bay area. In 2006, The Washington Post published a story about the Democracy Alliance, calling it an "exclusive donor club" for progressive donors and identifying Tompkins Buell and her husband Mark Buell as members. Tompkins Buell held a fundraiser for David Brock's Media Matters at her San Francisco home. A foundation that bears her name gave money to Media Matters through the Tides Foundation. Buell along with George Soros and other Democracy Alliance members John R. Hunting; Paul Rudd (co-founder of Adaptive Analytics); Pat Stryker; Nicholas Hanauer; ex-Clinton administration official Rob Stein; Drummond Pike; real estate developer Robert Bowditch; Pioneer Hybrid International-heir and congressional candidate Scott Wallace; Gail Furman; real estate developer Albert Dwoskin; and Taco Bell-heir Rob McKay, funded the Secretary of State Project, an American non-profit, 527 political action committee focused on electing reform-minded progressive Secretaries of State in battleground states, who typically oversee the election process. The Alliance was critical in getting California Secretary of State Debra Bowen and Minnesota Secretary of State Mark Ritchie re-elected.

In February 2012, Tompkins Buell stopped supporting President Barack Obama, citing disappointment with his leadership on environmental issues including climate change.

In 2016, Tompkins Buell donated $500,000 to lawyer Lisa Bloom's firm in order to assist women who came forward with sexual harassment and assault allegations against Donald Trump leading up to the 2016 presidential election.
