= Drummond Pike =

American businessman

- Born: Drummond MacGavin Pike; October 11, 1948 (age 77)
- Occupations: Philanthropist, political activist
- Known for: Founder of Tides Foundation

Drummond MacGavin Pike (born October 11, 1948) is an American philanthropist and progressive political activist. He founded the Tides Foundation in 1976 and served as its president until 2010. He currently serves as a principal at Equilibrium Capital Group. Pike helped pioneer the advent of donor-advised funds in philanthropy.

== Education ==
Pike studied political science at the University of California, Santa Cruz, and became involved in the anti-war movement in the late 1960s. He was selected as a campus representative to the Board of Regents during his senior year in 1969, and graduated with a B.A. in 1970. Pike continued his education at the Eagleton Institute of Politics at Rutgers University where he obtained a master's degree in Political Science.

== Career ==
In 1975, Pike co-founded the Youth Project in Washington D.C., serving as its associate director. He was subsequently hired as executive director of the Shalan Foundation, based in San Francisco.

Pike founded the Tides Foundation, the first fully staffed donor-advised fund in the United States, in 1976. At Tides, he pioneered the use of donor-advised funds as an instrument for donors to anonymously support philanthropic causes.

Pike was among the original founders of Working Assets (Credo), a San Francisco-based telecommunications company dedicated to progressive philanthropy and political activism. He founded Highwater, Inc., a real estate development venture designed to facilitate the provision of quality nonprofit workspace in metropolitan areas, in 1992. In 1994 he proposed the Thoreau Center for Sustainability to the Presidio Trust.

In 1996, Pike established the Tides Center, an offshoot of the Tides Foundation. The Tides Center provides grants management, administrative, financial and human resources services to charitable initiatives not yet incorporated as 501(c)(3)s.

Pike founded Groundspring.org in 1996. Groundspring.org was originally called eGrants and was later acquired by Network for Good.

In 2002, Pike became the founding chairman of Tides Canada Foundation, a parallel organization of the Tides Foundation. Tides Canada, which is based in Vancouver, was founded by Pike in 2000. Tides Canada makes grants through its foundation and has a charity that supports environmental and social justice projects. Tides Canada changed its name to MakeWay in 2020.

In 2008, Pike anonymously donated $1 million to ACORN after Dale Rathke, the brother of ACORN's founder Wade Rathke, was found to have embezzled $948,607.50 from the group and affiliated charitable organizations. ACORN had previously received funding from the Tides Foundation.

Pike along with George Soros and other Democracy Alliance members (John R. Hunting; Paul Rudd, co-founder of Adaptive Analytics; Pat Stryker; Nicholas Hanauer; ex-Clinton administration official Rob Stein; Gail Furman; real estate developer Robert Bowditch; Pioneer Hybrid International heir and congressional candidate Scott Wallace; Susie Tompkins Buell; real estate developer Albert Dwoskin; and Taco Bell heir Rob McKay) funded the Secretary of State Project, an American non-profit, 527 political action committee focused on electing reform-minded progressive Secretaries of State in battleground states, who typically oversee the election process. The Alliance was critical in getting California Secretary of State Debra Bowen and Minnesota Secretary of State Mark Ritchie re-elected.

== Awards ==
- 2004: National Philanthropy Day's Outstanding Foundation Professional Award.
- 2006: Mark Dubois Award from Friends of the River.
