= Pat Stryker =

American activist and philanthropist

- Born: April 6, 1956 (age 70); Kalamazoo, Michigan, US
- Education: University of Northern Colorado (dropped out)
- Occupation: Businesswoman
- Known for: Inheritance of one-third of the family shares in Stryker Corporation
- Political party: Democratic
- Children: 3
- Relatives: Jon Stryker (brother); Ronda Stryker (sister)); Homer Stryker (grandfather)

Patricia A. Stryker (born April 6, 1956) is an American billionaire businessperson, philanthropist, and political activist. Stryker is the granddaughter of Homer Stryker, founder of Stryker Corporation, a medical technology company.

Since the early 2000s, she has become more active in civic life. In 2001, she founded the Bohemian Foundation, which focuses on music, arts and the community through grantmaking, programs, and events. She donated $3 million to defeat a 2002 ballot initiative to limit bilingual education in Colorado. In 2004, she gave $20 million to Colorado State University, mostly to benefit its football team.

Stryker bought Sonoma's Sommer Vineyards in 1999, which she rebuilt, replanted, and rechristened as Stryker Sonoma. It covers 32 acres (129,000 m^{2}) in Alexander Valley, California, producer of classic vinifera varieties Bordeaux and Zinfandel. In May 2016, she sold the winery to focus on her foundation work.

As of 2021, Stryker ranks #340 on the Forbes Women 400.

== Early life ==
Patricia A. Stryker was born in Kalamazoo, Michigan, on April 6, 1956. Stryker enrolled at the University of Northern Colorado in Greeley, but did not complete a degree. In 1976, Stryker's father, Lee, died in an airplane accident in Wyoming. Four years later, in 1980, Stryker relocated to Fort Collins, Colorado, where she had attended summer camp as a child.

== Bohemian Foundation ==
Stryker has funded the Bohemian Foundation which, in addition to national and international programs, funds music and other initiatives in Larimer County, Colorado, the Fort Collins, Colorado area, notably the annual Bohemian Nights at New West Fest. She has also donated a substantial amount to Colorado State University, which is located in Fort Collins.

== Political donations ==
In 2006, Stryker gave $500,000 to the Coalition for Progress, a political action committee that donated heavily to support Democratic party candidates in Michigan elections.

In 2008, Stryker gave $87,500 to the Presidential Inaugural Committee for President-Elect Barack Obama.

Stryker donated $3 million to defeat a 2002 ballot initiative regarding bilingual education in Colorado.

Stryker donated $1.5 million to Priorities USA Action, a Super PAC supporting Democratic presidential candidate Hillary Clinton in 2016. She was among the largest donors in the 2016 election.

=== Political allies ===
Stryker, Jared Polis, Tim Gill, and Rutt Bridges are known in Colorado political circles as "The Four Horsemen" (aka "Gang of Four" or "The Four Millionaires") who have donated to liberal causes, fought against gerrymandering, and promoted progressive initiatives. Significant political contributions from the four to favored Democratic candidates has played a role in electing a Democratic majority in Colorado's house and senate. Stryker has been frequently represented at political meetings by Al Yates, former president of Colorado State University.

=== Democracy Alliance ===
According to New York Times reporter Matt Bai, Stryker attended the April 2005 meeting of the Democracy Alliance near Scottsdale, Arizona. Stryker along with George Soros and other Democracy Alliance members Gail Furman; Paul Rudd (co-founder of Adaptive Analytics); John R. Hunting; Nicholas Hanauer; ex-Clinton administration official Rob Stein; Drummond Pike; real estate developer Robert Bowditch; Pioneer Hybrid International-heir and congressional candidate Scott Wallace; Susie Tompkins Buell; real estate developer Albert Dwoskin; and Taco Bell-heir Rob McKay, funded the Secretary of State Project, an American non-profit organisation, 527 political action committee focused on electing reform-minded progressive Secretaries of State in battleground states, who typically oversee the election process. The Alliance was critical in getting California Secretary of State Debra Bowen and Minnesota Secretary of State Mark Ritchie re-elected.

== Personal life ==
Stryker is divorced, with three children, and lives in Fort Collins, Colorado, US.
