= Hanauer =

Hanauer is a surname. Notable people with the surname include:

- Adrian Hanauer (born 1966), American businessman
- Chip Hanauer (born 1954), American motorboat racer
- J. E. Hanauer (1850–1938), Palestinian writer and photographer
- Milton Hanauer (1908–1988), American chess player
- Nick Hanauer (born 1959), American businessman
