= John R. Hunting =

- Born: November 7, 1931 (age 94); Grand Rapids, Michigan
- Education: University of Michigan
- Occupations: Democratic activist Philanthropist
- Parent(s): Mary Ives Hunting; David Dyer Hunting Sr.

John R. Hunting (born November 7, 1931) is a philanthropist who is the son of David D. Hunting, founder of Steelcase, an office furniture manufacture based in Grand Rapids, Michigan. In 2006 he was noted as a major contributor to liberal or progressive 527 organizations. He was also the President of the Beldon Fund, which was an environmental fund that ceased to exist. He is particularly active on environmental causes, and also funds other progressive causes including EMILY's List.

== Biography ==
John R. Hunting was born to an Episcopalian family on November 7, 1931, at Blodgett Hospital in Grand Rapids, Michigan, the son of Mary (née Ives) and David Dyer Hunting Sr. His father was a co-founder of Steelcase. He went to school in East Grand Rapids, Michigan and later at the Cranbrook Academy in Bloomfield Hills, Michigan. He attended the University of Michigan but was drafted and spent two years in the United States Army. After his service, he graduated from the University of Michigan with a degree in guidance counseling and accepted a job at the Cranbrook academy as a teacher.

Hunting along with George Soros and other Democracy Alliance members Gail Furman; Paul Rudd (co-founder of Adaptive Analytics); Pat Stryker; Nicholas Hanauer; ex-Clinton administration official Rob Stein; Drummond Pike; real estate developer Robert Bowditch; Pioneer Hybrid International-heir and congressional candidate Scott Wallace; Susie Tompkins Buell; real estate developer Albert Dwoskin; and Taco Bell-heir Rob McKay, funded the Secretary of State Project, an American non-profit, 527 political action committee focused on electing reform-minded progressive Secretaries of State in battleground states, who typically oversee the election process. The Alliance was critical in getting California Secretary of State Debra Bowen and Minnesota Secretary of State Mark Ritchie re-elected.
