= Higher Education Recruitment Consortium =

Non-profit higher education consortium

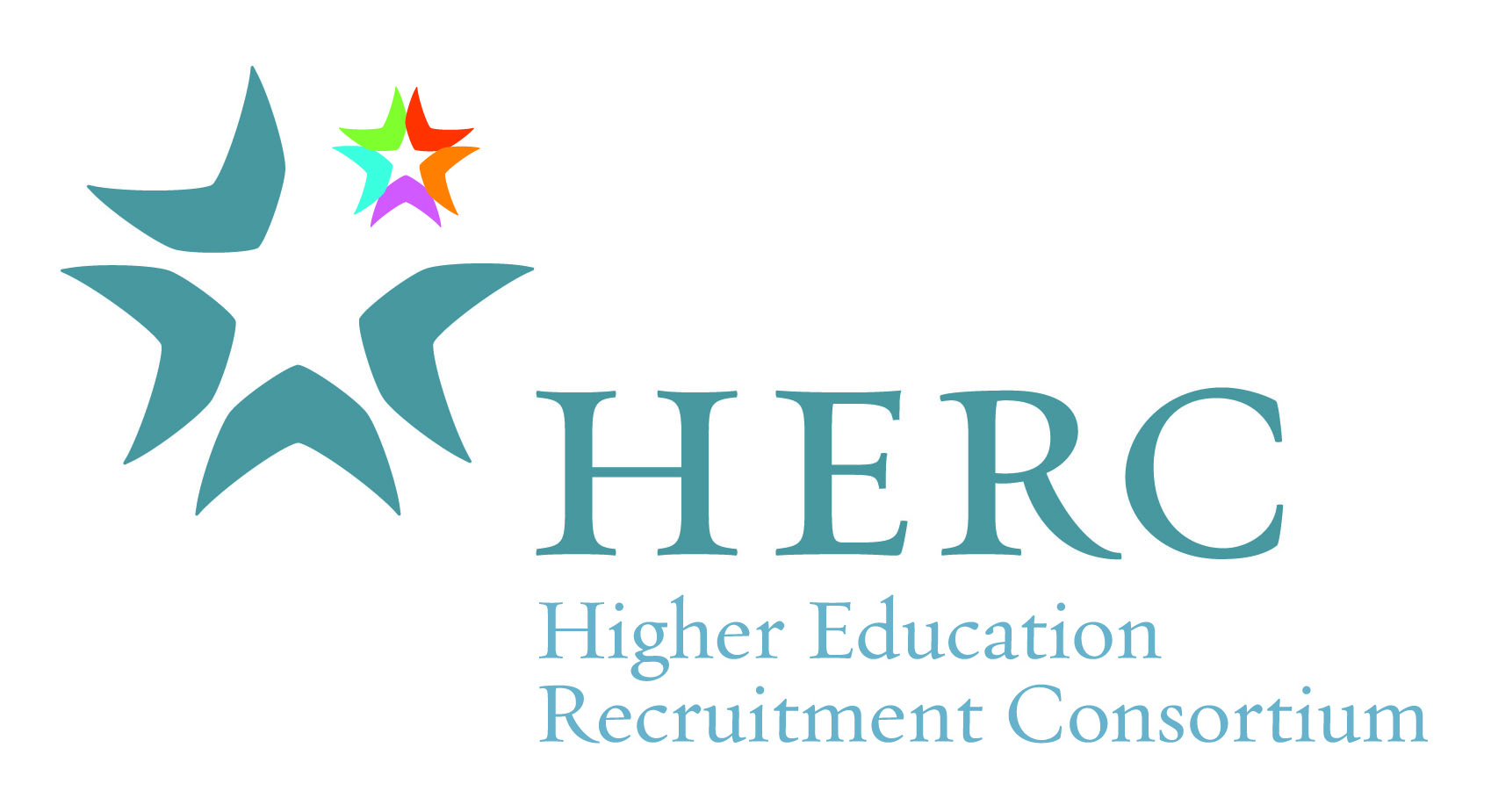
- Formation: 2000
- Founded at: Northern California
- Type: Non-profit

The Higher Education Recruitment Consortium (HERC) is a non-profit consortium of higher education institutions in the United States.

== History ==
The first HERC was established in Northern California in 2000 with Stanford, UC Berkeley, and the University of California, Santa Cruz as lead members, with the goal of allowing colleges and universities to collaborate on the recruitment of faculty, staff, and executives. There are currently nineteen regional HERCs in the United States, consisting of over 550 campuses in 22 states and the District of Columbia.

== National HERC ==
The National HERC was established in 2007 to support the independent but affiliated regional HERCs. It is a program of the Tides Center, a 501(c)(3) nonprofit organization. The National HERC is governed by an Advisory Board composed of the National HERC Director, ex officio, regional HERC directors, a member representative, and a member representative alternate from each regional HERC.

HERC maintains a regional, web-based search engine with listings for faculty and staff job openings at all member institutions, including a dual-career couple search option.

== HERC organizations ==
List of regional HERC organizations:

- Greater Washington State HERC
- Metro New York and Southern Connecticut HERC
- Michigan HERC
- Mid-Atlantic HERC
- New England HERC
- Northern California HERC
- Southern California HERC
- Upper Midwest HERC
- Upstate New York HERC

== See also ==
- Most placeable candidate
