= Secretary of State Project =

- Formation: 2006

Formed in the fall of 2006 by Becky Bond, Michael Kieschnick, and James Rucker, the Secretary of State Project was an American non-profit, progressive or liberal 527 political action committee focused on electing reform-minded progressive Secretaries of State in battleground states, who typically oversee the election process. They hoped to prevent a repeat of Florida 2000, where the projects backers claimed that a Republican Secretary of State, Katherine Harris, took a partisan role in helping to determine the 2000 presidential election results. The Project was funded by George Soros and members of the Democracy Alliance including Gail Furman, John R. Hunting; Paul Rudd; Pat Stryker; Nicholas Hanauer; Rob Stein; Drummond Pike; Robert Bowditch; Scott Wallace; Susie Tompkins Buell; Albert Dwoskin; and Rob McKay.

A notable achievement of the Secretary of State Project was the election of Minnesota Secretary of State Mark Ritchie in 2006. Ritchie played a pivotal role in adjudicating the 2008 Senate race between Al Franken and Norm Coleman, by examining disputed absentee ballots during the Minnesota Senate recount.

In 2010 during the midterm election GOP wave, the PAC was run by Laura Packard. 2 of 7 candidates were re-elected (California Secretary of State Debra Bowen and Minnesota Secretary of State Mark Ritchie). After 2010, the Project had disappeared.
