= Byron Williams =

Byron Williams may refer to:

- Byron Williams (gridiron football) (born 1960), former American football wide receiver
- Byron Williams (fictional character), a fictional character in the 1996 film Mars Attacks!
- Byron Williams (shooter) (born 1965), American responsible for the 2010 shootout with California Highway Patrol officers in Oakland, California
- Byron Williams, who died in police custody in Las Vegas in 2019 after telling officers "I can't breathe"
