= Pacific Coast Feather Company =

American bedding manufacturer

Pacific Coast Feather Co.
- Company type: Private
- Industry: Manufacturing
- Founded: 1884
- Founder: Fritz and Sigmund Hanauer
- Headquarters: Hayward, California
- Area served: North America
- Products: Down Bedding - pillows, blankets, comforters, feather beds, duvets, protectors
- Owner: Keeco, LLC
- Website: www.pacificcoast.com

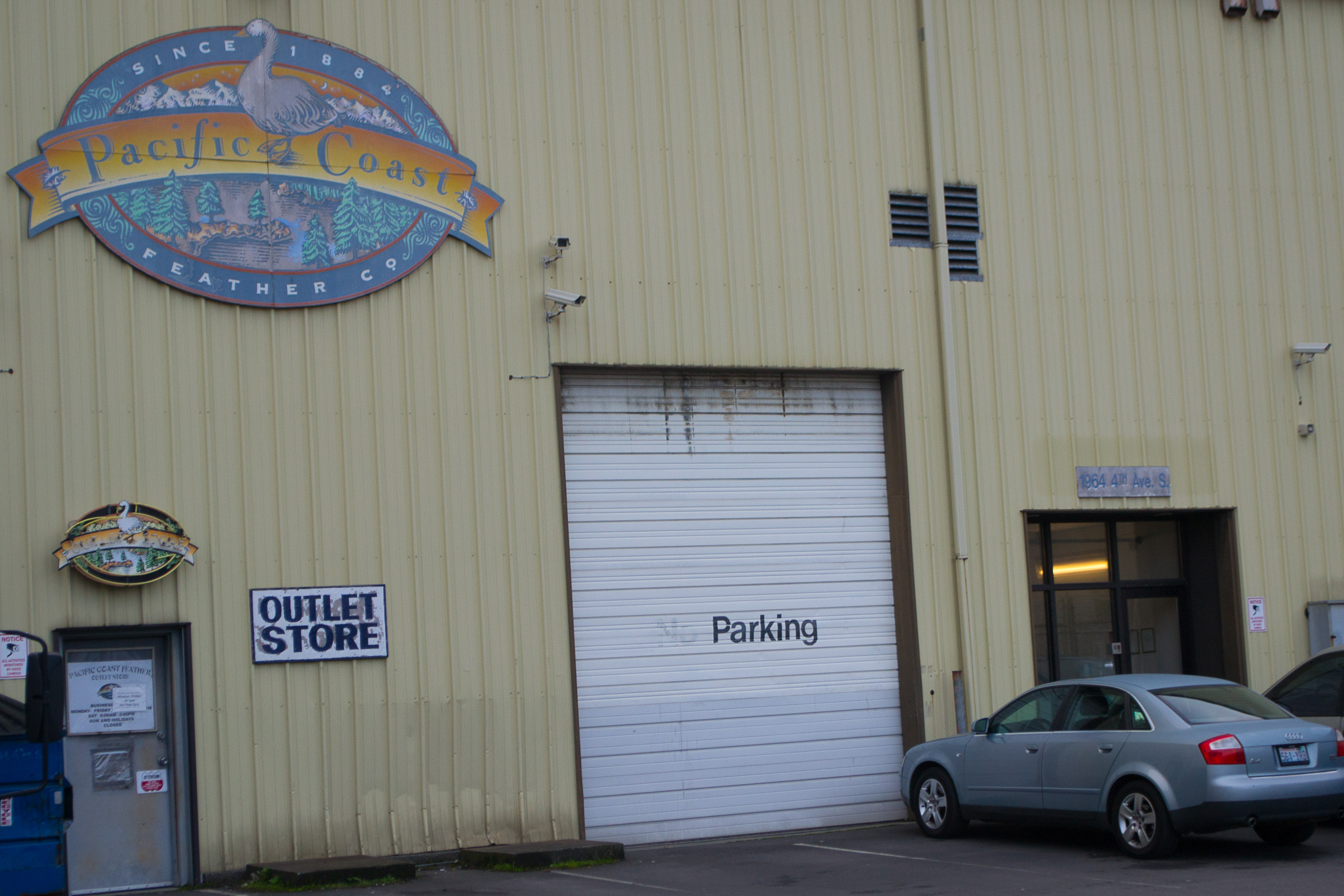
Pacific Coast Feather Company former Seattle headquarters

Pacific Coast Feather Company is a Hayward, California–based brand of basic bedding including pillows, comforters, sheets, and featherbeds.

Founded in 1884 and owned by the Hanauer family from 1924 through 2017, brothers Nick Hanauer and Adrian Hanauer (fourth generation) were co-chairmen until acquisition of the company by Hollander Sleep Products. President and CEO Mark Eichhorn, also CEO of Hollander Sleep Products, ran the day-to-day operations.

In June 2017 Hollander Sleep Products announced the acquisition of the Pacific Coast Feather Company in a statement posted on its website. Staffing changes occurred, resulting in a temporary disruption of service.

In 2021 Pacific Coast Feather Company/Hollander Sleep Products was acquired by Keeco, LLC, a Hayward, California-based supplier.

The company sells its products nationwide to major department store chains under the following brand names: Pacific Coast Feather, Down Around, Protect-a-Bed, BestFit!, EuroRest, Restful Nights, Calvin Klein, Spring Air, Sheex, Sleep for Success by Dr. Maas, Elie Tahari and Jockey. Additionally, the PCF name itself is licensed across a wide range of brands.

The company operates direct sourcing abroad and maintains six manufacturing plants in North America.

== Awards ==
- 2011 Good Housekeeping names Best Down Pillow and Best Down/Foam Pillow
- 2010 Good Housekeeping selects Best Mid-weight Comforter and Best Down Comforter
- 2004 QVC Vendor of the Year Award.
- 2002, 2003 BJ's Wholesale Club Business Partnership Award.
- 2002 QVC Q Star Award.
- 2001 JCPenney Supplier Divisional Award – Home Division.
- 2000 Marriott Corporation Product Innovation of the Year.
- 2000 Sears Partners in Progress Award.
