= John Hunting =

John Hunting may refer to:

- John Hunting (referee) (1935–2024), English football referee
- John Hunting (settler) (c. 1597–1689), Massachusetts settler
- John R. Hunting (born 1931), American philanthropist
