= Furman Center for Real Estate and Urban Policy =

American organization

Coordinates: 40.730922°N 73.999868°W

- Founded: 1995
- Website: furmancenter.org

The Furman Center for Real Estate and Urban Policy is a joint center at New York University School of Law and the NYU Wagner School of Public Service. The Furman Center was established in 1995 to create a place where people interested in affordable housing and land use issues could turn to for factual, objective research and information. Since that time, the Furman Center has become an authority on such matters in New York City. The Furman Center has a three-part mission, including providing objective academic research about land use, real estate, housing and urban affairs, with a particular focus on New York City, promoting intense debate and productive discussion among elected, academic, and industry leaders, and presenting essential data and analysis about the state of New York City's housing and neighborhoods.

== History ==
Michael H. Schill founded the center in 1995. Jay Furman endowed the center in 2000 and the center is renamed in his honor.

== Research ==
The Furman Center is constantly updating its collection of original research on four core issues, including affordable housing, housing finance and foreclosures, land use regulation and neighborhood change.

=== Affordable housing ===
The Furman Center produces a report every year called State of New York City's Housing and Neighborhoods.

=== Land use ===
The Furman Center also developed a website called, CoreData.nyc which is an exhaustive planning and real estate resource that contains a database of affordable housing developments across the New York City, along with indicators from the US Census Bureau and other sources to help promote evidence and data-based conversation about housing and land-use issues.

== Data services ==
=== NYCHANIS ===
New York City Housing and Neighborhood Information System or NYCHANIS is a database for community development organizations, housing organizations, and the general public. It provides Geographical Information Systems information about housing, neighborhood, and demographic conditions in New York City.

=== SHIP ===
Subsidized Housing Information Project or SHIP is a database with extensive information on nearly 235,000 units of privately owned subsidized rental housing in New York City. SHIP was launched on September 8, 2011.

The database details the four types of subsidies for rental units in New York City, including HUD Financing and Insurance, HUD Project-based Rental Assistance, the Mitchell-Lama program and Low-Income Housing Tax Credit (LIHTC) program. The database shows approximately 11,000 affordable-housing units which could possibly expire in the next few years without renewal because they are part of programs that no longer exist. The database is user-friendly, providing subsidy information to both policy makers and the public, especially New York tenants who reside in subsidized housing units.

The New York City Department of Housing Preservation and Development (HPD), the New York City Housing Development Corporation (HDC), New York State Homes and Community Renewal (HCR), the U.S. Department of Housing and Urban Development (HUD) engaged in an ongoing, multi-year partnership with the Furman Center to develop SHIP. The database was launched on September 8, 2011.

== Impact and recognition ==
The Furman Center and the Institute for Education and Social Policy (IESP) received one of nine grants provided through the MacArthur Foundation's $25 million initiative, How Housing Matters to Families and Communities.
