= Susan Walvius =

American businesswoman and basketball coach (born 1964)

Personal information
- Born: October 24, 1964 (age 61)

Career information
- High school: Gar-Field (Woodbridge, Virginia)

Susan Walvius (born October 24, 1964) is a businesswoman and entrepreneur. She is the co-founder and current co-CEO of SHEEX, Inc., a bed linen company specializing in sheets and pillowcases constructed from advanced athletic-performance fabrics. She is also a former head coach of the women's basketball team at the University of South Carolina. Her best success came in the 2001 and 2002 seasons, where she went 25–7 and 23–8 respectively. In those two seasons, the Gamecocks went 19–9 in Southeastern Conference play. The 2002 team made it to the Elite Eight for the first time in school history. On April 14, 2008, Walvius announced her resignation from South Carolina.

== Playing career ==
Walvius attended Gar-Field Senior High School in Virginia, prior to attending Virginia Tech, where she was an all-American basketball player.

As a player at Virginia Tech, Walvius established herself as one of the most successful players to wear a Hokie uniform. The four-year letterwinner was named to Virginia Tech's All-Decade team, is the school leader in career blocked shots and ranks second in field goals made and third in scoring and rebounds. An All-Metro Conference selection in 1986, Walvius was named All-America by Converse and Street & Smith's. She graduated in 1986 with a bachelor's degree in urban studies.

== Early coaching career ==
Walvius began her coaching career at Bradley University in 1986 as an assistant coach for two seasons. After spending a year in private business, she returned to coaching as an assistant at the University of Rhode Island from 1989 to 1990 before becoming the youngest head coach in the nation at Virginia Commonwealth University in 1990.

Walvius' ability to rebuild a program was first evident during the five years she spent at the helm of VCU. Only 25 years old when she was hired, Walvius coached at VCU from 1990 to 1995 and led the 1995 team to the Women's NIT after posting a 20–10 record. That 20-win season was just the second in the history of the VCU program. Walvius' effort did not go unnoticed as she was named the 1995 Virginia State Coach of the Year and was nominated for National Coach of the Year in District 3.

Leaving VCU in 1995, Walvius was the head coach at West Virginia University from 1995–1997. In just her second season at WVU, Walvius led the 1996–97 squad to its first winning season in five years with a 19–12 record. She displayed her ability as an outstanding recruiter by attracting a top-20 freshman class to West Virginia.

== University of South Carolina ==
Walvius was hired on April 28, 1997, as the head women's basketball coach at the University of South Carolina.

Susan Walvius led South Carolina into the postseason in five of her 11 seasons at helm, including five of the last seven. She took a floundering program to back-to-back NCAA Tournaments with an Elite Eight appearance in 2002, earning her SEC and WBCA District 3 Coach of the Year honors in just her fifth season on the job. Over her 11 seasons, she amassed a 165–160 record, giving her an 18-year career mark of 263–261.

Walvius built the program's success with a series of nationally ranked recruiting classes. Between 2003 and 2008, she signed four classes ranked among the nation's top 20, including a 2008 group that was as high as seventh by Blue Star Index in the early signing period. In total, she attracted six top-25 recruiting classes to the South Carolina campus. The 2007–08 class was tabbed as the No. 18 group in the nation by The Collegiate Girls Basketball Report, and Blue Star Index rated the 2005–06 class as the 13th-best in the country. The 2003 class was ranked as the 10th-best class in the nation by All-Star Girls Report. The 1998–99 freshman class was named as the 10th-best in the country, while the freshmen who entered Carolina in the fall of 1999 were named the 22nd-best group in the country.

Under Walvius, the Gamecocks emerged as one of the best defensive and rebounding teams in the Southeastern Conference the last two years. In 2006–07, South Carolina led the SEC in blocked shots, rebounding margin and rebounds per game and ranked second in the league in field goal percentage defense and steals. In 2007–08, the Gamecocks were among the league's top five in all but one of those defensive categories as well.

With Walvius stalking the sidelines, Carolina turned the Colonial Center into a difficult place for opponents to play in 2006–07, compiling a 15–5 record at home that included an 80–48 pounding of in-state rival Clemson, a 95–35 wipeout of SEC foe Alabama and an 81–40 second-round Women's NIT victory over America East Conference champion Hartford. In fact, the Gamecocks outscored the opposition by an average margin of just under 22 points per game in home games played during the 2006–07 campaign en route to matching a school record total for home victories.

Walvius' crew posted a nine-game improvement in 2005–06 from the year prior, a mark that led all Southeastern Conference schools and ranked as the fifth-largest improvement in any of the power conferences (SEC, ACC, Big Ten, Big 12, Pac-10, Big East). A significant factor in the Gamecocks' improvement was suffocating defense, as Carolina led the SEC and ranked second nationally in field goal percentage defense, holding the opposition to 34.7 percent shooting. Walvius' team also ranked among the national leaders in blocked shots (third; 6.7 per game) and rebounding margin (fifth; 8.3 per game) and ranked among the top 30 teams nationally in scoring margin (16th; +12.2 points per game), field goal percentage (22nd; 45.0%) and scoring defense (26th; 56.8 points per game).

The Gamecocks set the school record for blocked shots and field goal percentage defense in 2004–05, then came back to break both of those records in addition to setting a new school mark for scoring defense in 2005–06.

During the 2001–02 and 2002–03 seasons, Walvius posted a combined 48–15 mark with the Gamecocks and a 19–9 mark in the SEC. For her efforts, Walvius was honored as a finalist for Naismith Coach of the Year in each of those seasons.

Under Walvius in 2001–02, the Gamecocks recorded a 25–7 overall mark and finished second in the SEC with a 10–4 record. South Carolina advanced to the NCAA Tournament and into the Elite Eight for the first time in school history. The team achieved its first national ranking in 10 years and finished the season ranked sixth in the final ESPN/USA Today Coaches' Poll. For her achievements, Walvius was selected as the SEC Coach of the Year by her peers and by the Associated Press, and was named as the WBCA District 3 Coach of the Year.

In 2002–03, Walvius directed South Carolina to a 23–8 record and a 9–5 SEC mark. Ranked 18th in the final ESPN/USA Today Coaches' Poll, South Carolina secured a 20-win season for the second consecutive year and posted the school's first back-to-back NCAA Tournament appearances in 12 years. The Gamecocks defeated Tennessee-Chattanooga in the first round, marking the first back-to-back first round NCAA Tournament victories in South Carolina's history. The Gamecocks fell in the second round to host Penn State.

To celebrate the team's Elite Eight appearance in the 2002 NCAA Tournament, the Gamecock women were also chosen to open the state-of-the art Colonial Center on Nov. 22, 2002. The inaugural game attracted a state of South Carolina basketball record crowd of 17,712 to witness Carolina's victory over in-state rival Clemson. The record attendance was also the fifth-highest figure in the NCAA during the 2002–03 season.

While at South Carolina, Walvius worked hard to establish South Carolina's reputation as one of the up-and-coming women's basketball programs in the country. Her dedication to the program was critical to helping build top-notch facilities for the student-athletes, renewing the team's focus on academic success and developing the Mentors Program. Walvius is extremely involved with the marketing of the team and is a frequent guest speaker in the community and on radio and television.

Thanks to her work behind the scenes and on the sidelines, Gamecock home game attendance tripled. During the 2001–02 season, South Carolina established another precedent by selling out the Carolina Coliseum for the January 17th game against Tennessee. The announced attendance of 12,168 was the largest at any Carolina Coliseum sporting event all year.

Walvius' teams consistently achieved a high grade-point average and set a new team record with a 3.347 mark in the Spring 2005 semester. In addition, seven Gamecock players were named to the SEC Winter Sports Academic Honor Roll in 2005. Carolina led the league and set a new school record by placing 10 players on the SEC Winter Sports Academic Honor Roll in 2007, just one year after leading the conference with eight honor roll selections in 2006.

Walvius also recognized the importance of student-athletes receiving guidance in the real world before graduation, as she engineered the Mentors Program, which teamed up female leaders of the Columbia community with members of the Gamecock basketball team to further their real-world education, cultural and networking skills. The mentors helped the student-athletes work on their cultural and business education for life after basketball.

== Coaching timeline ==
South Carolina, head coach 1997–2008

West Virginia, head coach 1995–97

VCU, head coach 1990–95

Rhode Island, assistant coach 1989–90

Bradley, assistant coach 1986–88

== Head coaching record ==
Record table
Season	Team	Overall	Conference	Standing	Postseason
VCU (Sun Belt Conference) (1990–1991)
1990–91	VCU	12-16	1-5		
VCU (Sun Belt):		12-16 (.429)	1-5 (.167)		
VCU (Metro Conference) (1991–1995)
1991–92	VCU	17-12	4-8		
1992–93	VCU	15-12	5-7		
1993–94	VCU	3-24	0-12		
1994–95	VCU	20-10	6-6		
VCU (Metro):		55–58 (.487)	15-33 (.313)		
VCU (Total):		67-74 (.475)			
West Virginia (Big East) (1995–1997)
1995-96	West Virginia	12-15	7-11	T-4th	
1996-97	West Virginia	19-12	11-6	4th	
West Virginia (Total):		31-27 (.534)	18-17		
South Carolina (SEC) (1997–2008)
1997-98	South Carolina	13-15	3-11	T-11th	
1998-99	South Carolina	11-16	0-14	12th	
1999-00	South Carolina	13-15	3-11	11th	
2000-01	South Carolina	11-17	6-8	T-6th	
2001-02	South Carolina	25-7	10-4	T-2nd	NCAA Elite 8
2002-03	South Carolina	23-8	9-5	T-5th	NCAA Second Round
2003-04	South Carolina	10-18	1-13	12th	
2004-05	South Carolina	8-21	2-12	12th	
2005-06	South Carolina	17-12	7-7	7th	WNIT Second Round
2006-07	South Carolina	18-15	6-8	T-7th	WNIT Third Round
2007-08	South Carolina	16-16	4-10	T-9th	WNIT Second Round
South Carolina (Total):		165-160 (.508)	51-103 (.331)		
Total:		263–261 (.502)			
National champion Postseason invitational champion Conference regular season champion Conference regular season and conference tournament champion Division regular season champion Division regular season and conference tournament champion Conference tournament champion

== Launching SHEEX ==
In 2008, Walvius and former South Carolina assistant Michelle M. Marciniak founded SHEEX, Inc., a company that is said to offer "the world's first athletic-performance sheets". Constructed from materials commonly found in modern athletic wear, SHEEX provide similar moisture-wicking, temperature-control, breathability and stretch not found in traditional cotton sheeting.

== Notable ==
Susan Walvius coached three players who went on to play in the WNBA after their careers at South Carolina. Under Walvius, the Gamecocks advanced to the Elite Eight in 2002 with Walvius earning SEC Coach of the Year recognition. Carolina had consecutive top-20 finishes in 2002 and 2003 with Walvius at the helm. Under Walvius, South Carolina made five trips to the postseason in her last seven years, including consecutive postseason appearances in 2006, 2007 and 2008. In her 11th year at Carolina, Walvius was the fourth-longest tenured SEC coach at her current school, trailing only Pat Summitt (34 years, Tennessee), Andy Landers (29 years, Georgia) and Sharon Fanning (13 years, Mississippi State). Under Walvius' direction, the Gamecocks were one of the SEC's elite defensive teams. Carolina has ranked in the top three in the conference each of the last four years in field goal percentage defense and blocked shots. Walvius led Carolina to a nine-game improvement and a trip to the postseason in 2005–06. Walvius was responsible for the inception of the Mentors Program, in which successful women from the community work with South Carolina's female student-athletes to help them achieve their goals both in and out of the classroom. From 2004 through 2008, Walvius' players have appeared on the SEC Winter Sports Academic Honor Roll 38 times, a figure that leads all SEC schools during that time. In fact, South Carolina's 38 honorees is more than twice as many as seven SEC schools during that same time (Auburn, Georgia, Kentucky, LSU, Mississippi State, Ole Miss, and Vanderbilt.) During the 2001–02 season, the Gamecocks were ranked in the top 10 nationally for the first time since the 1981–82 season.
