= Mad Pizza =

Chain of pizzerias in the U.S. state of Washington

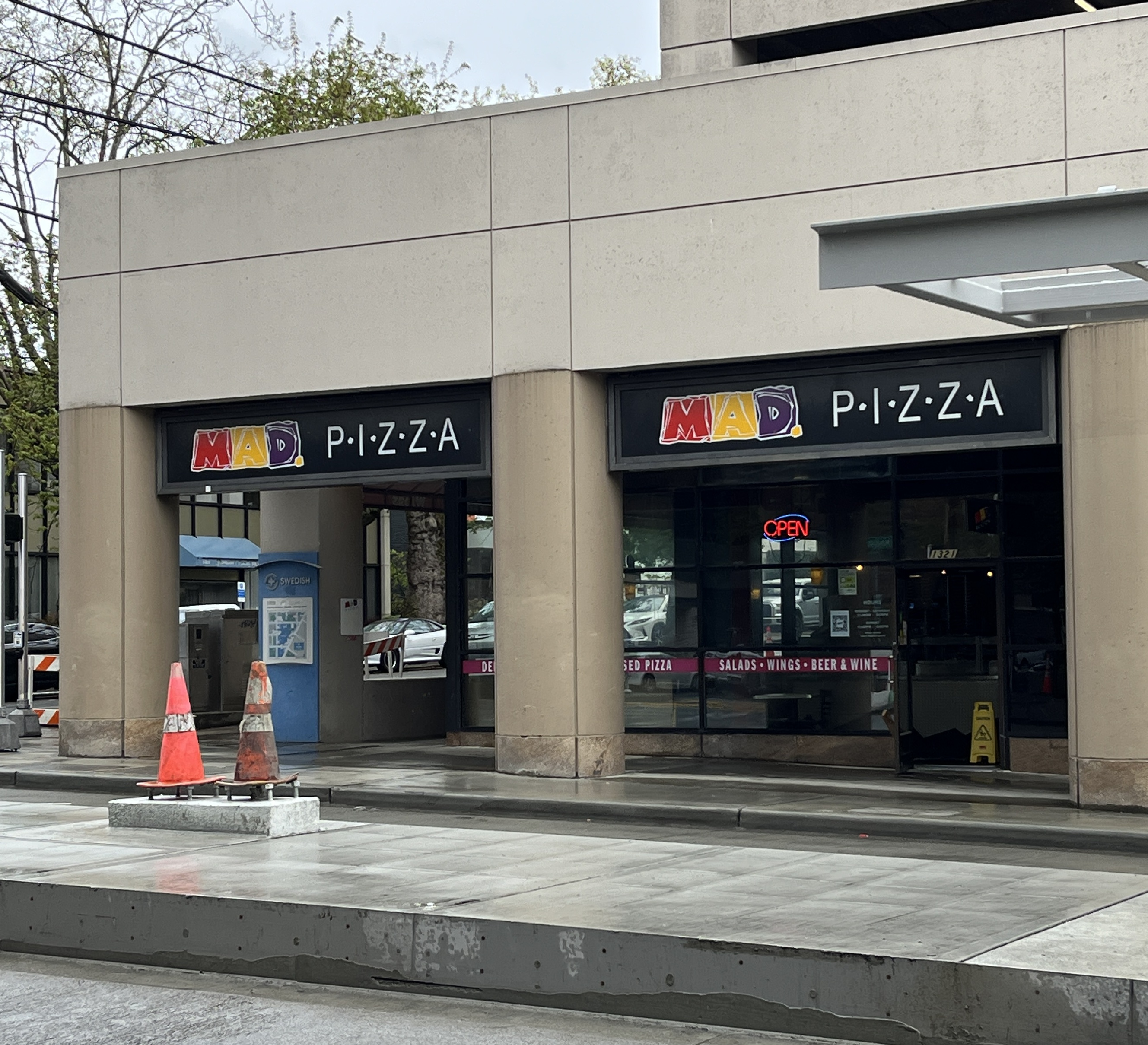
- Exterior of Mad Pizza on Madison Street in First Hill, Seattle, 2024
- Interactive map of Mad Pizza

Restaurant information
- Location: Washington, United States
- Coordinates: 47.6103°N 122.3219°W

Mad Pizza is a small chain of pizzerias in the Seattle metropolitan area, in the U.S. state of Washington.

== Description ==
Mad Pizza is a chain of pizzerias in the Seattle metropolitan area. Approximately half of the pizzas used a pesto base, as of 2013. Pizza varieties include the Killer Tomato, the Nurse Ratchet, and the Prozac Pie, which has pepperoni, sausage, copacola, black olives, mushrooms, and onions. The Rastaman has Jamaican jerk chicken and yellow pepper, and the Schizophrenic has a garlic-ricotta base with apples, red onions, oranges, roasted cashews, and Gorgonzola.

== History ==
Mad Pizza is owned by Brett Chatalas, Seattle Sounders general manager Adrian Hanauer, and Bill Tamiesie. The business has operated on Capitol Hill and on Madison Street in Seattle's Madison Park neighborhood. The Madison Park location opened in c. 1995 and closed in October 2013, and was replaced by a Vietnamese restaurant. Mad Pizza has also operated at Starfire Sports, in Tukwila.

== See also ==
- List of pizza chains of the United States
