= Jay Furman =

American real estate developer (1942 - 2015)

Jay Martin Furman
- Born: July 15, 1942
- Died: January 4, 2015 (age 72)
- Occupation: Real estate developer
- Known for: President of RD Management LLC
- Spouse(s): Gail Gorman (divorced); Victoria Moran
- Children: Jason Furman; Jesse Furman

Jay Furman (July 15, 1942 – January 4, 2015) was an American developer and owner of real estate located in thirty-nine U.S. states and Puerto Rico. He had significant interests in more than 150 shopping centers, office buildings, hotels and industrial/storage facilities. Furman served as the president of RD Management LLC and oversaw the operations of all of its affiliates.

== Biography ==
Furman was born to a Jewish family, the son of real estate developer Morris Furman. He has one sister, Barbara Furman Murray. Furman graduated from Harvard University. He also has a master's degree in economics from Columbia University and a J.D. from the New York University School of Law. After school he worked for the family company, eventually assuming control. He developed or acquired over 125 properties during the period from 1993 through mid-2006, and at the time of his death had over 20 properties under development.

Furman was on the board of governors of the New York Academy of Sciences and a trustee of New York University(Chairman of the Real Estate Committee), New York University School of Law (Chairman of the Academic Affairs Committee), UJA (Chairman of the Real Estate Committee), Educational Alliance, Jewish Home & Hospital of Manhattan, Jazz at Lincoln Center and the Child Study Center at the New York University Medical Center. Furman oversaw the development and construction of Furman Hall, a $100 million facility, which doubled the academic capacity of the law school. Furman Hall was completed ahead of schedule with considerable construction budget savings realized.

Furman also was on the board of directors of the Great Neck Arts Center and was instrumental in creating and programming their "Cinematheque Independent Filmmakers" series, which he endowed from 1997 onward; was the founder and chairman of the advisory board of the Furman Center for Real Estate and Urban Policy, and founder of the Furman Academic Scholarship at the New York University School of Law and was on the National Advisory Board of Futures for Children.

He was one of the investors in the Broadway production of The Wedding Singer.

== Personal life ==
His first wife was Gail Gorman; they had two children: economist Jason Furman and federal judge Jesse Furman. They later divorced. Furman died of lung cancer on January 4, 2015, at the age of 72. He was survived by his two sons and a stepson, Eric, from his second marriage to Victoria (née Moran) Furman. Services were held at the Central Synagogue in Manhattan.
