= Michelle M. Marciniak =

American basketball player (born 1973)

Michelle Marciniak
Personal information
- Born: October 29, 1973 (age 53) Silver Spring, Maryland, U.S.
- Listed height: 5 ft 10 in (1.78 m)
- Listed weight: 154 lb (70 kg)

Career information
- High school: Allentown Central Catholic (Allentown, Pennsylvania)
- College: Notre Dame (1991–1992); Tennessee (1993–1996)
- Playing career: 1996–2002
- Position: Point guard
- Number: 3
- Coaching career: 2003–2008

Career history

Playing
- 1996–1997: Portland Power
- 1997–1998: Philadelphia Rage
- 1998: Nashville Noise
- 2000: Portland Fire
- 2001–2002: Seattle Storm

Coaching
- 2003–2008: South Carolina (assistant)

Career highlights
- ABL All-Star (1997); NCAA champion (1996); NCAA Tournament MOP (1996); First-team All-SEC (1995); Horizon All-Freshman Team (1992); Naismith Prep Player of the Year (1991); Gatorade National Player of the Year (1991)
- Stats at Basketball Reference
Medals
Women's basketball
Representing the United States
World University Games
Gold medal – first place	1995 Fukuoka	Team competition
Jones Cup
Gold medal – first place	1996 Taipei	Team Competition
Pan American Games
Bronze medal – third place	1999 Winnipeg	Team
FIBA Under-18 Americas Championship
Silver medal – second place	1992 Mexico	Team

Michelle Marie Marciniak (born October 29, 1973) is a former All-American collegiate and professional basketball player who played point guard in the Women's National Basketball Association (WNBA). As a floor general, Marciniak competed for two national championships during her three-year career at the University of Tennessee. She led the Tennessee Lady Vols to their fourth national championship and, in 1996, was named most valuable player in the Final Four Women's Tournament in Charlotte, North Carolina.

She later was the recruiting coordinator/assistant coach of the women's basketball team at the University of South Carolina from 2003 to 2008. Marciniak was responsible for two back to back top recruiting classes, rated #18 in 2007 and #7 in 2008, the highest ranked class ever recruited at South Carolina.

Marciniak is currently the co-founder and co-chief executive officer of Sheex in Marlton, New Jersey, a performance fabric bedding company.

== Early years and education ==
Marciniak was born in Silver Spring, Maryland, on October 29, 1973.

Marciniak attended Allentown Central Catholic High School in Allentown, Pennsylvania, where she played high school basketball in the highly respected East Penn Conference. In 1991, as an Allentown Central Catholic High School senior, she was named National Player of the Year by Parade magazine, Naismith National Player of the Year, and Gatorade National High School Player of the Year. In February 1991, Sports Illustrated profiled Marciniak in an article titled "She's the Ponytailed Princess of the Hoop," which covered her performance as a high school junior at Allentown Central Catholic High School. She scored 3,025 points for Allentown Central Catholic High School, and the school later retired her number 23 jersey number in recognition of her extraordinary high school basketball achievements.

=== Collegiate career ===
After a year at Notre Dame, Marciniak transferred to Tennessee, where she quickly became a leader in its dominant team under head coach Pat Summitt. Summitt had recruited her at Allentown Central Catholic High School, where she went into labor as she was sitting in the Marciniaks' home on a recruiting trip. Summitt quickly wrapped up the visit and flew back to Knoxville, where she gave give birth to her son, Tyler. "Spinderella", as Marciniak was affectionately known because of her free wheeling, spinning, and slashing style, became a crowd favorite at Tennessee. She scored over 1,000 points and remains ranked among Tennessee's top ten all-time in assists and three-point scoring, despite only playing three seasons.

With Marciniak at point guard, the Lady Vols won consecutive Southeastern Conference championships in 1995 and 1996. In the NCAA Women's Division I Basketball Championship, Tennessee came in second to the Connecticut Huskies. In the 1995-1996 season, Tennessee wasn't expected to be as strong, but the team lost just four games during the regular season and returned to the Final Four, where they faced a rematch with Connecticut. In the game, Marciniak led the team to an 88-83 overtime victory, then avenged an earlier loss to Georgia to claim Tennessee's fourth national championship. During the season, Marciniak became the focused leader and played a methodical style of basketball that Pat Summitt demanded from her point guards. Marciniak was chosen the NCAA Division I basketball tournament Most Outstanding Player for her play. She graduated from the University of Tennessee in 1996 with a degree in psychology.

== Career ==
=== USA Basketball ===
Marciniak was named to the USA U18 team, then called the Junior World Championship Qualifying Team, in 1992. The team competed in Guanajuato, Mexico, in August 1992. The team won their first four games, then lost 80–70 to Brazil, finishing with the silver medal for the event, but qualifying for the 1993 world games. Marciniak averaged 6.8 points per game during the event.

Marciniak continued with the team to the 1993 U19 World Championship, then called the Junior World Championship. The team won five games and lost two, placing seventh in the championship. Marciniak averaged 3.3 points per game.

Marciniak represented the U.S. at the 1995 World University Games held in Fukuoka, Japan in August and September 1995. The team had a record of 5–1, securing the silver medal. The USA team won early and reached a record of 5–0 when the USA beat Yugoslavia. In the semi final game, the USA faced Russia. The team was behind much of the first half but managed to tie the game at the half. The USA broke the game open in the second half and won 101–74. The gold medal match was against unbeaten Italy. Marciniak averaged 2.9 points per game.

Marciniak was invited to be a member of the Jones Cup team representing the US in 1996. She helped the team to a 9–0 record, and the gold medal in the event. Marciniak averaged 7.4 points per games, had 24 assists, second-highest on the team, and recorded 21 steals, the team's highest.

Marciniak participated on the USA team as part of the 1999 Pan American Games in Winnipeg, Canada. The team went 4–3 and earned a bronze medal.

=== WNBA ===
Marciniak began her professional career in the women's American Basketball League, playing all 2 1/2 seasons of the league's existence. She played for the ABL's Portland Power, Philadelphia Rage, and Nashville Noise. After her first season as a professional, Marciniak was a first team All Star in a league loaded with talent. Marciniak was signed by the WNBA's expansion Portland Fire in 2000 where she was an integral part of Portland's success. In 2002, she signed with the Seattle Storm, where she played for the following next three seasons. She was a fan favorite and received the WNBA Community Service Award.

In 2003, Marciniak tussled with Los Angeles Sparks player Latasha Byears in a nationally-televised game. Byears intentionally threw a ball at Marciniak's face, and Marciniak, in response, charged the much larger and stronger Byears.

Marciniak retired at 29 years old, after the Storm's 2002 season, to become an assistant coach for the University of South Carolina Gamecocks in the powerhouse SEC Conference, where she had played as a collegian. Marciniak served as an assistant on the staff of head coach Susan Walvius from 2003 to 2008. She is also an occasional color analyst for WNBA and National Collegiate Athletic Association (NCAA) basketball games on ESPN Radio and other media outlets.

=== SHEEX ===
In 2007, she co-founded SHEEX, a Cherry Hill, New Jersey-based performance bedding and sleepwear company, with Susan Walvius, a former collegiate basketball coaches and athlete. The company introducied what it describes as the world’s first athletic-performance sheets, using fabric technology traditionally found in sportswear. SHEEX products are designed to improve sleep quality through enhanced breathability, moisture-wicking properties, stretch, and temperature control.

The concept for SHEEX was developed when Marciniak and Walvius identified a gap in the bedding market. Drawing on their backgrounds in athletics, they noted that the materials used in high-performance athletic wear could be applied to bedding to create a more comfortable and functional sleep environment. Rather than traditional cotton, SHEEX bedding is made from a proprietary blend of advanced performance fabrics that mimic the qualities of workout gear. These materials help regulate body temperature, wick away moisture, and allow for increased airflow, making them suitable for individuals seeking cooler and more breathable sleep solutions.

The inspiration behind the company was rooted in personal experience. As a former professional basketball player, Marciniak was familiar with the physical demands placed on athletes and the essential role that rest and recovery play in peak performance. The idea was to create a product that would support better sleep for athletes and active individuals, ultimately helping them to recover more efficiently and perform at higher levels. Over time, the appeal of SHEEX products extended beyond athletes, attracting a broader audience that includes hot sleepers, individuals in warm climates, and consumers interested in innovative sleep technology.

Initially focused on bed sheets, the company later expanded its product line to include pillowcases, duvet covers, mattress toppers, and sleepwear, incorporating the same performance fabric principles. The brand has been featured in several media outlets and has partnered with athletic organizations and wellness-focused retailers to expand its reach.

The company operates primarily through its e-commerce platform but has also distributed products through select retail partners. The company employs between 11 and 50 people. Revenue figures vary depending on the source, with estimates ranging from approximately $3.5 million to as much as $30 million annually.

SHEEX has positioned itself as a leader in the performance bedding category, a niche market that blends athletic textile technology with sleep health and wellness. It addresses overheating and discomfort during sleep. The company continues to focus on innovation, product development, and expanding its customer base while maintaining its core mission: to improve sleep through scientifically designed materials inspired by athletic performance.

== Career statistics ==
Legend
GP	Games played	GS	Games started	MPG	Minutes per game	RPG	Rebounds per game
APG	Assists per game	SPG	Steals per game	BPG	Blocks per game	PPG	Points per game
TO	Turnovers per game	FG%	Field-goal percentage	3P%	3-point field-goal percentage	FT%	Free-throw percentage
**Bold**	Career best	°	League leader

=== College ===
Year	Team	GP	GS	MPG	FG%	3P%	FT%	RPG	APG	SPG	BPG	TO	PPG
1991–92	Notre Dame	31	-	-	39.8	20.0	77.3	**3.4**	2.7	2.0	**0.3**	-	**12.3**
1992–93	Tennessee	Sat out due to NCAA Transfer rules											
1993–94	Tennessee	32	-	-	40.5	**32.8**	68.8	1.8	2.9	1.5	0.2	-	6.2
1994–95	Tennessee	**36**	-	-	**44.4**	30.4	72.9	2.7	**5.7**	2.3	0.1	-	10.8
1995–96	Tennessee	**36**	-	-	43.9	20.3	**79.5**	3.0	4.3	**3.0**	**0.3**	-	11.6
**Career**		135	-	-	42.3	26.6	75.3	2.8	4.0	2.2	0.2	-	10.3
Statistics retrieved from Sports-Reference.

=== WNBA ===
Legend
GP	Games played	GS	Games started	MPG	Minutes per game	RPG	Rebounds per game
APG	Assists per game	SPG	Steals per game	BPG	Blocks per game	PPG	Points per game
TO	Turnovers per game	FG%	Field-goal percentage	3P%	3-point field-goal percentage	FT%	Free-throw percentage
**Bold**	Career best	°	League leader

==== Regular season ====
Year	Team	GP	GS	MPG	FG%	3P%	FT%	RPG	APG	SPG	BPG	TO	PPG
2000	Portland	**32**	0	**16.8**	**37.7**	**33.3**	57.3	**1.8**	**2.3**	**1.2**	**0.2**	**2.1**	**5.5**
2001	Seattle	27	**5**	14.5	36.7	30.3	54.1	1.4	1.7	1.1	0.1	1.1	4.9
2002	Seattle	23	1	12.2	35.3	25.0	**75.9**	1.2	1.7	0.5	0.1	1.1	3.1
Career	3 years, 2 team	82	6	14.7	36.8	31.6	60.3	1.5	1.9	1.0	0.1	1.5	4.6

==== Playoffs ====
Year	Team	GP	GS	MPG	FG%	3P%	FT%	RPG	APG	SPG	BPG	TO	PPG
2002	Seattle	2	0	14.5	20.0	0.0	100.0	1.0	0.5	1.5	0.0	2.0	4.0
Career	1 year, 1 team	2	0	14.5	20.0	0.0	100.0	1.0	0.5	1.5	0.0	2.0	4.0
