= Rutt Bridges =

American politician

Rutt Bridges is an American geophysicist and politician from Colorado and a member of the Democratic Party.

== Business success ==
Bridges began his career with Chevron Corporation, then founded Advance Geophysical in 1980. He achieved success with the software products MicroMAX and ProMAX, both used for the processing of seismic data for the petroleum exploration industry. In recognition of his business accomplishments, he was awarded the Enterprise Award in 1991 by the Society of Exploration Geophysicists He is also the chairman of Quest Capital, a private venture capital fund.

== Public career ==
In 1999, Bridges founded the Bighorn Center, to "give Colorado's political middle a credible and legitimate voice in the state's increasingly polarized landscape and more importantly, to get things done." The Bighorn Center closed in 2006, but the very successful bi-partisan Bighorn Leadership Program is still providing leadership training and development at Colorado State University. In 2004 Bridges ran for the U.S. Senate in Colorado, but stepped aside and supported fellow Democrat and friend Ken Salazar, who went on to win the seat. Looking to the 2006 election, he declared his candidacy for Governor of Colorado. However, he dropped out of the race on August 8, 2005, telling supporters "My passion has always been public policy, not politics."

Along with Tim Gill, Jared Polis, and Pat Stryker, Bridges has been named as one of the "Gang of 4" responsible for donating large sums of money through 527 groups to Democratic Party-related causes in Colorado. They are credited with helping the Democrats to win control of the Colorado General Assembly in 2004.
