= Performance bedding =

Performance bedding is a bedding product not made from traditional material such as cotton. Performance bedding includes memory foam, gel, polyester, or proprietary fabrics. Bedding products include sheets, pillows, and mattress protectors. Because of the different properties of polyester compared to cotton, moisture may be wicked away from the body during sleep. The low absorbency qualities of polyester means it is more resistant to stains than cotton.

The company Sheex manufactures performance bedding.
