= Jason Furman =

American economist and political adviser (born 1970)

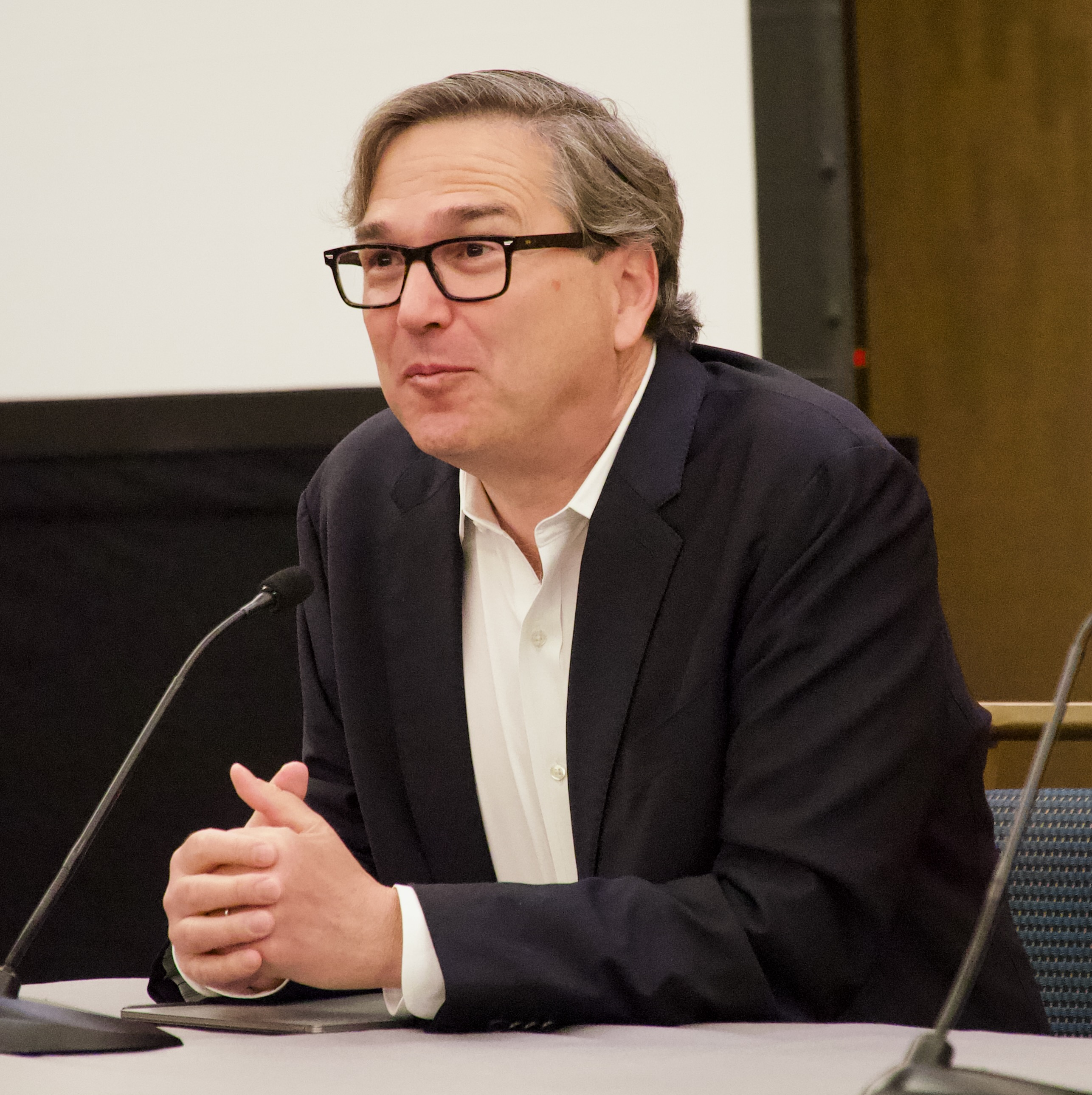
- Furman in 2025

28th Chair of the Council of Economic Advisers
- In office August 2, 2013 – January 20, 2017
- President: Barack Obama
- Preceded by: Alan Krueger
- Succeeded by: Kevin Hassett

Personal details
- Born: August 18, 1970 (age 56) New York City, New York, U.S.
- Party: Democratic
- Spouse: Eve Gerber
- Children: 3
- Parents: Jay Furman; Gail Furman
- Relatives: Jesse M. Furman (brother)
- Education: Harvard University (BA, MA, PhD); London School of Economics (MSc)

Jason Furman (born August 18, 1970) is an American economist and professor at the Harvard Kennedy School. and a nonresident senior fellow at the Peterson Institute for International Economics. On June 10, 2013, Furman was named by President Barack Obama as chair of the Council of Economic Advisers (CEA). Furman has also served as the deputy director of the U.S. National Economic Council, which followed his role as an advisor for the Barack Obama 2008 presidential campaign.

Since 2019, he has taught Economics 10, the year-long introductory economics course at Harvard, together with David Laibson.

Furman is also a member of the Council on Foreign Relations, the Group of Thirty and the Aspen Economic Strategy Group. He also serves as a Trustee of the Russell Sage Foundation and on the advisory boards for the Brookings Papers on Economic Activity, the Bund Summit, the Hamilton Project and the Washington Center for Equitable Growth. In addition to articles in scholarly journals and periodicals, Furman is a regular contributor to The Wall Street Journal and Project Syndicate and the editor of two books on economic policy.

== Early life and education ==
Born and raised in New York City, Furman is the son of Jay Furman, a real estate and shopping mall developer, and Gail Furman, a child psychologist. Furman is Jewish. Furman's brother, Jesse M. Furman, is a judge of the United States District Court for the Southern District of New York.

Furman graduated from the Dalton School in 1988. In 1992, he graduated with an AB in social studies from Harvard University, where his freshman year roommate was Matt Damon. He then received an MSc from the London School of Economics. Furman later returned to Harvard, where he received an AM in government in 1995 and a PhD in economics in 2004. His PhD thesis advisor was Greg Mankiw, who had served as chairman of the Council of Economic Advisers under the administration of George W. Bush.

== Early career ==
In 1996, while he was a graduate student at Harvard, Furman was hired by economist Joseph Stiglitz to serve a one-year stint as a staff economist for the Council of Economic Advisers. He later worked with Stiglitz at the World Bank before joining the National Economic Council as a Special Assistant to the President during the Clinton administration. Furman was involved to varying degrees with the presidential campaigns of Al Gore and Wesley Clark, along with his wife, Eve Gerber, who also contributed as a speechwriter for Clark. In 2004, he took a position as director of economic policy for the 2004 Kerry presidential campaign. At the outset of the election, Furman joined the Center on Budget and Policy Priorities (CBPP) where he was credited with helping defeat the privatization of Social Security proposed by the George W. Bush administration.

He was a visiting scholar at New York University's Robert F. Wagner Graduate School of Public Service and taught as a visiting lecturer at Columbia University and Yale University.

From 2006 to 2008, Furman was a senior fellow at the Brookings Institution and director of the Hamilton Project, an economic policy research group that develops policy proposals to achieve shared economic growth founded by former Clinton Treasury Secretary Robert Rubin. During his tenure, Furman published papers on tax treatment of healthcare and edited two published volumes.

== Obama administration ==
In 2008, Furman joined Barack Obama's presidential campaign as the Economic Policy Director. Initially, Furman's appointment as a campaign adviser had been criticized by some labor activists for his defense of Walmart's business model. During Obama's first term, Furman served as the deputy director at the National Economic Council to Lawrence Summers and Gene Sperling. In this role, he was one of the architects of the American Recovery and Reinvestment Act of 2009, including stimulus-spending initiatives to benefit the poor as well as business tax incentives. Furman is also credited with helping to create the administration's corporate tax-overhaul plan, influencing fiscal policy negotiations, and for helping to design and negotiate the Patient Protection and Affordable Care Act ("ACA" or "ObamaCare").

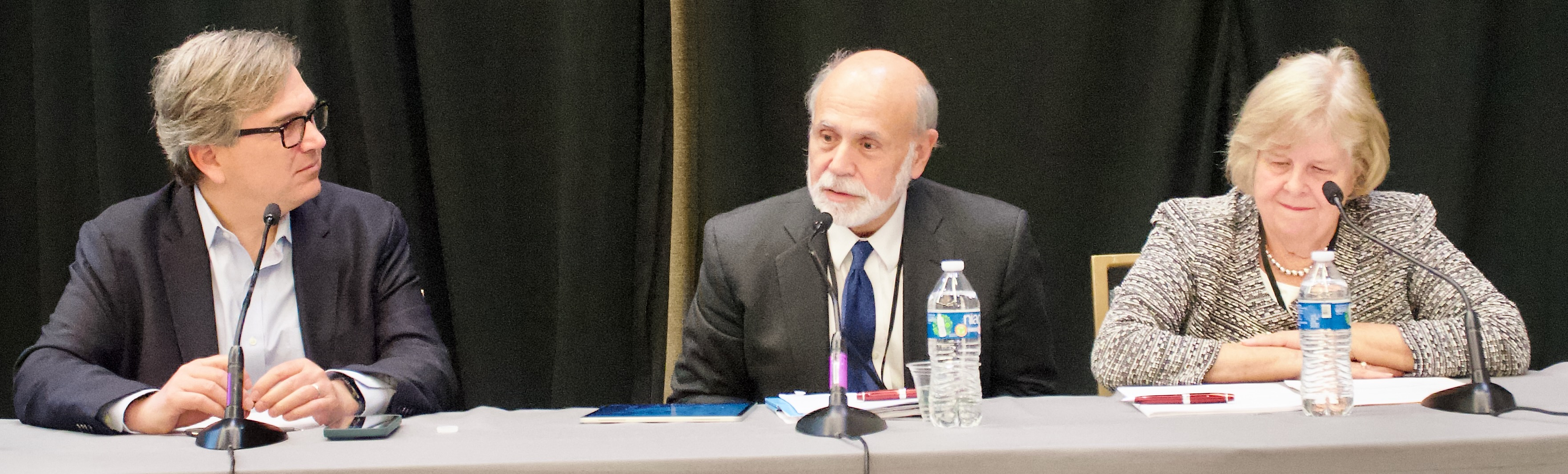
Furman, Ben Bernanke, Christina Romer at AEA 2025 in a panel on inflation

On June 10, 2013, Furman was named chairman of the three-member Council of Economic Advisers by President Obama. Obama referred to Furman as "one of the most brilliant economic minds of his generation" and said "there's no one I'd rather turn to for straightforward, unvarnished advice that helps me to do my job." His appointment to the role was met with bipartisan support. During his tenure as chairman, Furman played a role in advancing economic debates and public policies around tax reform, competition, artificial intelligence and innovation, and investment issues. As CEA chair, Furman was a cabinet-level government officer and a regular attendee of meetings of the Cabinet of the United States.

== Personal life ==
Furman and his wife Eve (née Gerber) live in Cambridge, Massachusetts, with their three children.

Political offices
Preceded by Alan Krueger	Chair of the Council of Economic Advisers; 2013–2017	Succeeded by Kevin Hassett
