= Jesse M. Furman =

American judge (born 1972)

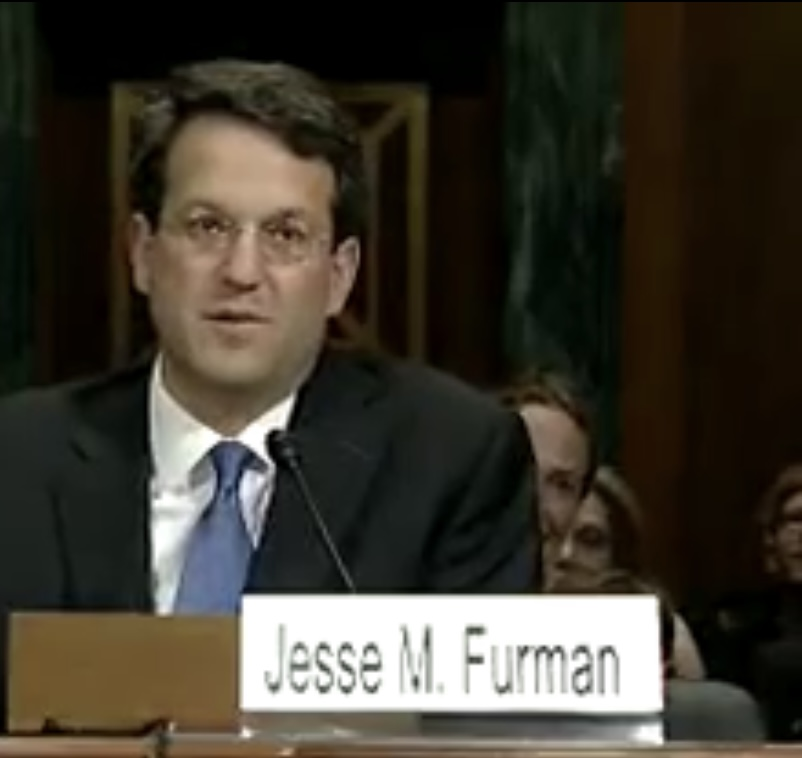
- Furman in 2011

Judge of the United States District Court for the Southern District of New York
- Incumbent
- Assumed office February 17, 2012
- Appointed by: Barack Obama
- Preceded by: Alvin Hellerstein

Personal details
- Born: Jesse Matthew Furman; 1972 (age 53–54) New York City, U.S.
- Spouse: Ariela Dubler
- Parent(s): Gail Furman; Jay Furman
- Relatives: Jason Furman (brother)
- Education: Harvard University (BA); University of Oxford; Yale University (JD)

Jesse Matthew Furman (born 1972) is a United States district judge of the United States District Court for the Southern District of New York.

== Early life and education ==
Furman is the son of psychologist Gail (née Gorman) and real estate developer Jay Furman. He earned a Bachelor of Arts from Harvard College in 1994 and then was a Henry Fellow at the University of Oxford from 1994 to 1995. He received a Juris Doctor from Yale Law School in 1998. From 1998 to 1999, Furman served as a law clerk for then United States District Judge and future United States Attorney General Michael Mukasey. From 1999 to 2000, he clerked for United States Court of Appeals for the Second Circuit Judge José A. Cabranes. From 2002 to 2003, he clerked for Associate Justice David Souter.

== Career ==
Furman worked as a lawyer at the law firm Wiggin & Dana from 2000 to 2002 and again from 2003 to 2004. In 2004, he became a federal prosecutor in the Southern District of New York, where he served as an Assistant United States Attorney. From 2007 to 2009, he worked in the office of the United States Attorney General as Counselor to the Attorney General. A 2005 New York Observer article named him as a potential future Supreme Court nominee.

=== Federal judicial service ===
On June 7, 2011, President Barack Obama nominated Furman to a seat on the United States District Court for the Southern District of New York that had been vacated by Judge Alvin Hellerstein, who assumed senior status in January 2011. On September 15, 2011, the Senate Judiciary Committee reported his nomination to the Senate floor by a voice vote. On February 15, 2012, Senate Majority Leader Harry Reid filed cloture on Furman's nomination. The Senate vitiated the cloture motion on February 16 and confirmed Furman on February 17, by a 62–34 vote. He received his commission the same day.

=== Notable cases ===
On March 24, 2018, United States Secretary of Commerce Wilbur Ross announced his decision to add a question about citizenship status to the 2020 Census questionnaire, asserting that it was necessary to help the Justice Department enforce the Voting Rights Act of 1965. Two groups of plaintiffs filed lawsuits in the United States District Court for the Southern District of New York to block the question. The cases were assigned to Furman, who rejected the plaintiffs' claim that adding the question violated the Enumeration Clause of the U.S. Constitution but held that Ross's decision violated the Administrative Procedure Act and that the Voting-Rights-Act-enforcement rationale was a pretext designed to conceal the true reasons for adding the question. Furman entered an order blocking implementation of Ross's decision. On June 27, 2019, the Supreme Court affirmed Furman's order, agreeing that the Voting-Rights-Act-enforcement rationale was pretextual. The Court's decision left open the possibility that Ross could try again to add the citizenship question to the 2020 Census, but the Trump administration did not make a second attempt.

On March 10, 2025, Furman blocked the deportation of Mahmoud Khalil, a Palestinian activist Immigrations and Custom Enforcement had detained two days earlier. Two days later, Furman granted Khalil two attorney-client-privileged phone calls, but also ruled that he would remain detained.

== Personal ==
Furman is married to Ariela Dubler a former Columbia Law School professor who now heads the Abraham Joshua Heschel School, a Jewish day school in New York. His brother Jason Furman served as an economic adviser to President Obama and is an economics professor at Harvard University.

Furman is Jewish. He has been noted for his strict observance, including adjourning court early for Shabbat and closing his chambers on Rosh Hashanah.

== See also ==
- List of Jewish American jurists
- List of law clerks for the third seat of the Supreme Court of the United States
- List of lawsuits involving Donald Trump

Legal offices
| Preceded by Alvin Hellerstein | Judge of the United States District Court for the Southern District of New York; 2012–present | Incumbent |
