= Thoreau Center for Sustainability =

Tides' Thoreau Center for Sustainability are green nonprofit centers that house more than 70 nonprofit organizations in San Francisco and New York City. Thoreau Centers for Sustainability are operated by Tides Shared Spaces, a Tides initiative.

== History ==
In 1994, the Thoreau Center for Sustainability was proposed to The Presidio Trust in San Francisco, California and opened in 1996. It is an adaptive reuse of the Letterman Army Hospital.

In 2006, a Thoreau Center for Sustainability opened in Lower Manhattan, New York.
