= Sheex =

American bed linen company

SHEEX, Inc.
- Type: Private
- Industry: textile industry consumer goods industry
- Founded: 2008
- Founder: Michelle M. Marciniak; Susan Walvius
- Headquarters: Columbia, United States
- Key people: Susan Walvius (Co-founder/Co-CEO); Michelle M. Marciniak (Co-founder/Co-CEO)
- Products: Bed linens
- Website: www.SHEEX.com

SHEEX, Inc. is a bed linen company based in the United States. The company was founded in 2008 by former athletes and basketball coaches Susan Walvius and Michelle M. Marciniak. SHEEX linens are notable for being constructed not from cotton or silk but the type of advanced performance fabrics commonly found in modern athletic wear. They are described as performance bedding.

== History/founders ==
SHEEX, Inc. was founded in 2008 by former University of South Carolina women's basketball coaches Susan Walvius and Michelle M. Marciniak. Walvius had coached Division I basketball for 21 years, starting at Bradley and Rhode Island prior to becoming the head coach at Virginia Commonwealth and later West Virginia. From 1997 through the 2007-08 season, Walvius was head coach at the University of South Carolina, where she was named 2002 Southeastern Conference Coach of the Year. Marciniak, a former WNBA player, 11-year veteran of USA basketball and Final Four MVP, had served on Walvius' staff since 2003.

== Products ==
SHEEX have been called "the world's first athletic-performance sheets". Constructed from materials commonly found in modern athletic wear or sleepwear produced by companies like Under Armour, Nike and others, SHEEX offer similar moisture-wicking, temperature-control, breathability and stretch not found in traditional cotton or silk sheeting.

SHEEX products are available for home, boating and RV environments. The company's boating products have received praise due to the flexible fabric's ability to conform readily to odd-shaped boat berths.
