= Adrian Hanauer =

American sports businessman

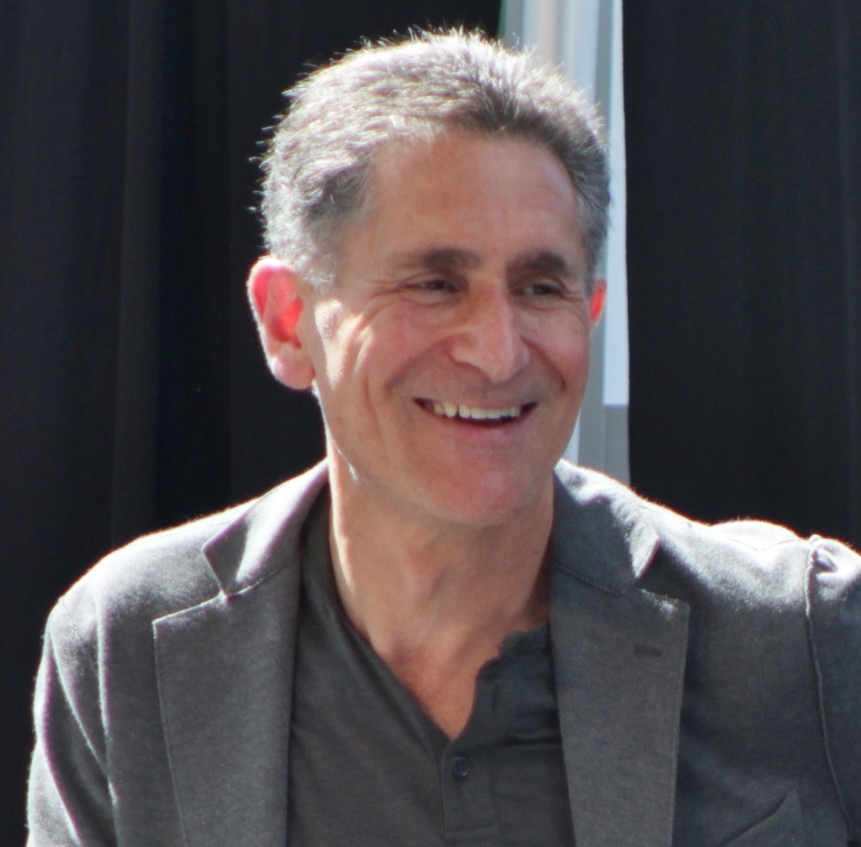
- Hanauer in 2025
- Born: February 7, 1966 (age 60)
- Education: University of Washington
- Occupation: Businessman
- Employer: Museum Quality Framing
- Known for: Seattle Sounders FC ownership
- Relatives: Nick Hanauer (brother)

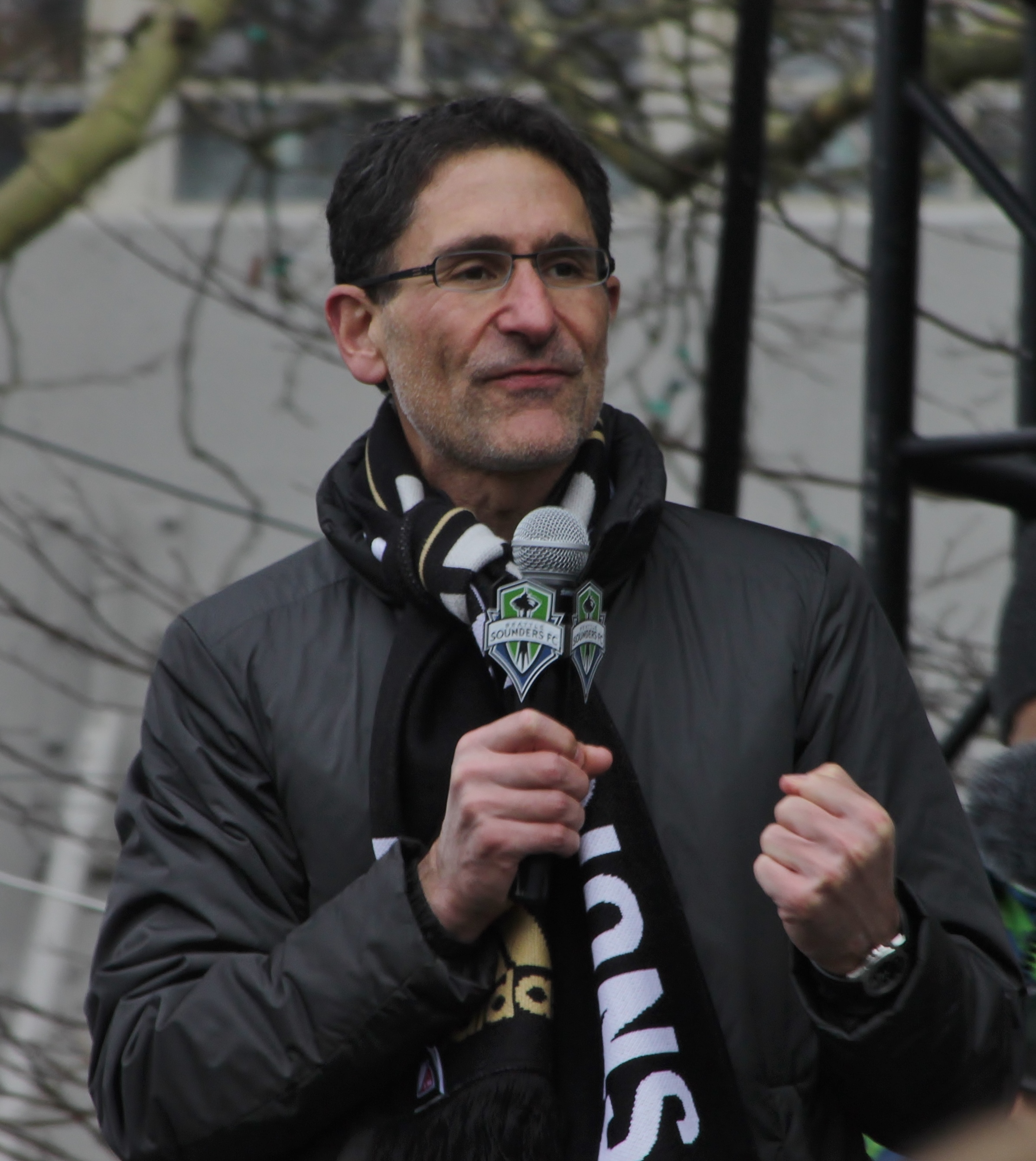
Hanauer in 2016

Adrian Hanauer (born February 7, 1966) is an American businessman and majority owner of Seattle Sounders FC of Major League Soccer. He is also one of the minority owners of the Seattle Kraken of the National Hockey League and the governor of Seattle Reign FC, a National Women's Soccer League team that the Sounders co-own with the Carlyle Group.

== Business history ==
Hanauer's family owned the Pacific Coast Feather Company, a down pillow, feather bed, and high-end bedding products manufacturer that was founded in 1884 in Germany, and is now headquartered in Seattle. While Hanauer never held an executive position within the company, he began working at the company at 13.

Hanauer founded Museum Quality Framing, which is a chain of custom frame stores in Washington, Oregon, and Idaho, in 1988. Hanauer used to own a chain of pizza stores called Mad Pizza. As an early investor in Amazon and aQuantive, an online based advertising company, Hanauer turned a substantial profit when the latter company went public in 2000 and again when Microsoft purchased the company in 2007.

He became the managing partner for the USL Seattle Sounders in 2001, shortly after a meeting with general manager Brad Kimura on a flight. Hanauer began reducing the financial losses the team was taking, which had been $1 million per year for the preceding five years, and reduced the losses to $350,000 per year. The team also attained success on the field under Hanauer's leadership as interim general manager, going 23-4-1 in his first season, the second best record in USL history, and made it to the league championship game three times, winning it twice. Hanauer also began working on getting a Major League Soccer team in Seattle. The league passed over Seattle in 2004, choosing instead to expand to better prepared Salt Lake City. Hanauer invested $250,000 for a 15 percent stake in an English soccer team Cambridge United FC in May 2007.

Following the MLS All Star game in July 2007, Hanauer was introduced to Hollywood executive, director, and film producer Joe Roth by MLS commissioner Don Garber. The two men hit it off and over the next few weeks, Roth made several visits to Seattle to take in a few Sounders games and get to know Hanauer better. By November, the two had brought in Microsoft co-founder Paul Allen and comedian Drew Carey as investors and MLS had announced Seattle as the next expansion team.

In 2005, Hanauer founded business incubator and venture capital company Curious Office Partners. The company invests in small internet startup companies and offers them office space in Pioneer Square and invests between US$10,000 and $250,000 in the startups. In 2018, he and his brother sold the Pacific Coast Feather Company.

Hanauer joined the ownership group of the Seattle Kraken, an expansion franchise in the National Hockey League, in 2018. He and his mother Lenore also acquired a minority stake in Reign FC of the National Women's Soccer League the following year. The stake was later acquired by OL Groupe in December 2019. The Reign were acquired by the Sounders and The Carlyle Group in 2024; Hanauer serves as governor of the team.

== Personal life ==
Hanauer's interest in soccer began at the age of 3, he saw his first North American Soccer League Sounders game at the age of 8, and he was one of only two freshmen to make the soccer team for Mercer Island High School. While Hanauer did not make the team as a sophomore, he continued to play soccer, first on an intramural team while attending University of Washington and now on two teams in the Greater Seattle Soccer League.
