= Oakland freeway shootout =

2010 California politically-related incident

- Location: I-580, Oakland, California
- Date: July 18, 2010
- Target: California Highway Patrol officers
- Attack type: Shootout
- Weapons: M1A rifle; 9mm handgun
- Deaths: 0
- Injuries: 3 (including the perpetrator)
- Perpetrator: Byron Williams
- Motive: Extremist anti-government beliefs

The Oakland freeway shootout occurred on July 18, 2010, when two California Highway Patrol officers on I-580 in Oakland, California, attempted to stop Byron Williams, whose speeding pickup truck was seen on westbound Interstate 580 weaving through traffic.

== Shootout ==
Williams, a multiple-felon, who had previously been convicted twice for bank robbery, was stopped after a CHP officer purportedly observed him weaving at excessive speed on the 580 west bound. Williams yielded near the Harrison Street on ramp. After being approached by the officer, Williams or the officer began firing with a handgun. Williams, who purportedly received a gunshot wound to the back of his head, fired three rounds with his 9mm handgun. As additional CHP officers arrived on scene, more gunfire ensued. Williams then started firing an M1A .308 rifle at the officers. He reloaded the rifle once, firing a total of seven .308 rounds. He was wearing a bulletproof vest which was not impacted during the entire exchange, although the CHP fired a collective 198 rounds from pistols, shotguns, and .223 rifles. Williams did not surrender until he was struck by numerous bullets. The shootout lasted for 12 minutes. In addition to Williams, two officers received minor injuries from flying glass.

== Background ==
Byron Williams police booking photo

Until the time of his arrest, Williams had been living with his mother, Janice Williams, in the rural town of Groveland in Tuolumne County. News media have reported that Williams was 45 years old in 2010 and was an unemployed carpenter.

== Intended targets ==
Oakland police spokesperson Jeff Thomason confirmed at Williams' July 20 arraignment that evidence indicated Williams planned to target the San Francisco offices of the American Civil Liberties Union of Northern California and the Tides Foundation. Investigators reported Williams told them he wanted to "start a revolution by traveling to San Francisco and killing people of importance at the Tides Foundation and the ACLU."

In an interview with Media Matters for America, Williams claimed that he chose the Tides Foundation as a target because he believed that American billionaire philanthropist George Soros "has the Tides Foundation and the Tides fund," which he uses "for all kinds of nefarious activities." While some outlets have suggested a link between right wing rhetoric and the shootout, in an interview with Examiner.com, Williams spoke more about his influences, stating that he felt outlets like Fox News Channel were neglectful when it came to organizations like the Tides Foundation, and cited a variety of websites and outlets as influences, including conspiracy theorists David Icke and Alex Jones.

== Trial and sentence ==
In March 2014, Williams was convicted of four counts of premeditated attempted murder of a peace officer, as well as weapons violations. On April 3, he was sentenced to 401 years in prison. He died on February 2, 2017.
