= Most placeable candidate =

Term used in the recruiting industry

Most placeable candidate (MPC) is a term used by the recruiting industry to describe a candidate that the recruiter is willing to represent into a market because the recruiter believes they can place the candidate with a company.
