= Tides Foundation =

American public charity and fiscal sponsor

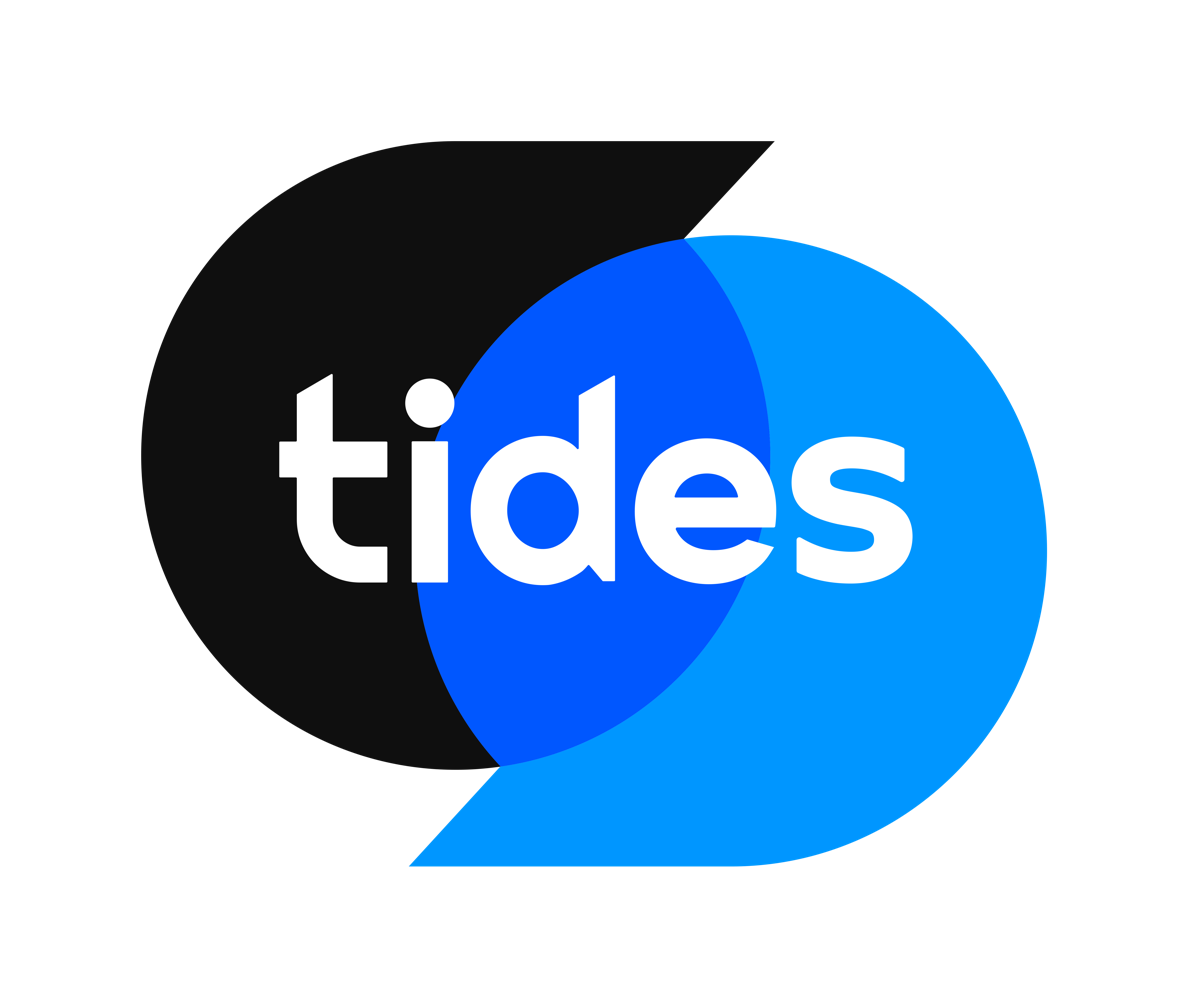
- Founded: 1976; 50 years ago
- Founder: Drummond Pike
- Type: Public charity
- Location(s): San Francisco, California; New York City, New York
- Region served: Worldwide
- Services: Donor-advised fund, fiscal sponsorships, collective action funds, consulting services
- Key people: Janiece Evans-Page (CEO)
- Revenue: $350 million (2023)
- Expenses: $712 million (2023)
- Website: www.tides.org

Tides Foundation is a left-leaning donor advised fund based in the United States that manages over $1.4 billion in assets. It was founded in San Francisco in 1976 by Drummond Pike. Tides distributes money from anonymous donors to other organizations, which are often politically progressive.

== History ==
Tides was founded in 1976 by philanthropist Drummond Pike with assistance from Jane Bagley Lehman, granddaughter of R.J. Reynolds. Lehman was the organization's chair from 1976 until her death in 1988; Pike was the organization's chief executive officer until 2010. It is named after Tides Bookstore, a defunct bookstore in Sausalito. Tides was conceived as a nationally oriented community foundation, and founded out of Pike's frustration with established philanthropy's perceived neglect of progressive issues.

Pike envisioned using fiscal sponsorship for progressive political activism. Fiscal sponsorship uses a tax-exempt charity to provide financial support to a non-exempt project or organization, thereby lending it tax exemption as long as the charity retains control of the way its funds are spent. In The Givers: Wealth, Power, and Philanthropy in a New Gilded Age, David Callahan wrote that Pike was an "entrepreneurial activist" and that Pike and his "wealthy friends" united to create Tides which "used donor-advised funds to direct resources to progressive causes." Callahan, who is the co-founder of the think tank Demos, contrasted this with a similar approach taken by DonorsTrust, an American non-profit donor-advised fund founded in 1999 to safeguard the "intent of libertarian and conservative donors".

Tides founded People for the American Way with Norman Lear and the National Network of Grantmakers in 1980. By the 1990s, Tides was providing more than US$10 million in grants annually. In 2000, Tides launched a program called "Bridging the Economic Divide." It focused on funding living wage campaigns and economic justice coalitions. Tides also launched the Tides Death Penalty Mobilization Fund, which supports the anti-death penalty movement. The Michigan Partnership to Prevent Gun Violence was founded with support from Tides.

Tides allocated $75 million per year in donor money by 2009, most of which went to fund progressive political causes.

Tides has been the subject of rhetorical attacks by conservative commentators, including Glenn Beck and others on Fox News. In 2010, an assassin attempted to attack the offices of Tides, but was stopped by members of the California Highway Patrol. The assassin said they were inspired by what they had seen on Fox News. Following the attack, Pike called for advertisers to pull their sponsorships for programs on the network.

The Wikimedia Foundation, the non-profit organization which manages Wikipedia, has worked with the Tides Foundation since 2016. The multimillion-dollar Wikimedia Endowment was created in 2016 to support the Wikimedia projects and was managed by Tides until 2023, when it was spun off into its own nonprofit. Wikimedia both donates to the Tides Foundation and receives money from the organization; Wikimedia gave Tides $5 million a year for the endowment, but Tides' filings listed the donation in only one year. Wikipedia's fundraising strategy stresses that it depends on donations, however, about 2% of the money raised went to hosting and none went to volunteer editors of the encyclopedia. The foundation's 2020 net assets of $180.3 million could have covered hosting costs for about 75 years, not including the endowment. In 2019, Amanda Keton, who had set up the endowment at the Tides Foundation and served as CEO of Tides Advocacy, became Wikimedia's general counsel. That same year, Wikimedia gave Tides Advocacy $8.7 million. In 2020, Wikimedia established a $4.5 million donor-advised fund, the Wikimedia Foundation Knowledge Equity Fund, at Tides Advocacy. As of August 2023, the endowment had not published details of its expenses or salaries, despite repeated promises to become a more transparent 501(c)(3) organization.

In 2020, Tides conducted a campaign encouraging its donors to move funds from more static donor-advised fund accounts to Tides-led initiatives in one of the organization's grantmaking areas, spurring spending and grantmaking, leading to Tides providing approximately $200M in grants to promote civic engagement and combat voter suppression in 2024.

== Donations ==
Organizations that began as projects of Tides include Campaign to Defend the Constitution, Higher Education Recruitment Consortium, People for the American Way, Pew Internet and American Life Project, Rockridge Institute, Social Venture Network, Urgent Action Fund, and V-Day. The Tides website lists 130 current grantees. As Tides is a public charity, it allows sponsors to donate money to different organizations—including for-profit as well as nonprofit entities—through donor-advised funds. Donor-advised funds are funds held in accounts by nonprofit organizations, like Tides, that then make grants to third-party entities on the donor's behalf. Organizations that have partnered with Tides to set up these funds include Girl Rising and the Humble Bundle.

Tides launched a program called "Bridging the Economic Divide" in 2020. It focused on funding living wage campaigns and economic justice coalitions. Tides also launched the Tides Death Penalty Mobilization Fund, which supports the anti-death penalty movement. The Michigan Partnership to Prevent Gun Violence was founded with support from Tides.

The Open Society Foundations, funded by George Soros, contributed $25.8 million to Tides between 2020 and 2021, earmarking some of its donations for pro-Palestinian causes. The Rockefeller Brothers Fund contributed nearly $1 million to Tides in 2023, earmarking the majority of it for Palestine Legal and the Adalah Justice Project. The Ford Foundation is also a donor to the Tides Foundation.

The Tides Foundation has funded Jewish Voice for Peace, the Council on American Islamic Relations, IfNotNow, Code Pink, and the Westchester County Peace Action Committee, which supports Students for Justice in Palestine and American Muslims for Palestine. These organizations have been involved in pro-Palestinian protests on college campuses in 2024 and 2025.

The Washington Free Beacon reported that in 2023, the Tides Foundation gave $286,000 to the Alliance for Global Justice, a group best known for serving as the fiscal sponsor of Samidoun. Samidoun has been designated as a terrorist group by Canada and Israel. Samidoun was sanctioned by the U.S. Treasury Department in October 2024 and labeled a "sham charity" for providing material support to a Palestinian terrorist organization that participated in the October 7 Hamas terrorist attacks.

In 2024, Jewish Insider reported that the Tides Foundation had funded a number of organizations involved in anti-Israel protests on college campuses and was "facing scrutiny from the House Ways and Means Committee for serving as a conduit to hide the identity of donors to its grantees."

In May 2024, Politico reported that the Tides Foundation was "seeded by Democratic megadonor George Soros." Politico reported that Tides was funding Columbia University pro-Palestinian campus protests and occupations during the Gaza war via its donations to Jewish Voice for Peace and IfNotNow.

== Reception and image ==
Democratic Senator Sheldon Whitehouse described Tides as a dark money group on the left, similar to those on the right. The Black Lives Matter Global Network Foundation (BLM GNF) sued Tides in 2024 for alleged mismanagement of donations and improperly withholding managed funds. BLM GNF voluntarily dismissed its suit against Tides, with prejudice, and retracted all claims and allegations as part of the settlement in 2026.

== Advocacy Fund ==
Tides is affiliated with the Tides Advocacy Fund (also known as Tides Advocacy), a liberal lobbying group. In the 2012 election cycle, the Advocacy Fund gave $11.5 million to 501(c)(4) organizations, including $2 million to the League of Conservation Voters, $1.8 million to America Votes and $1.3 million to the Center for Community Change. The Advocacy Fund has also supported the environmentally-focused groups Bold Nebraska, National Wildlife Federation Action Fund, NRDC Action Fund, and the Sierra Club.

The Advocacy Fund contributed to campaigns opposing Colorado Amendment 46, Colorado Amendment 47, Colorado Amendment 49 and Colorado Amendment 54 in 2008. The Advocacy Fund distributed $11.8 million in grants in 2013 to groups promoting mass amnesty for illegal immigrants, increased worker protections, chemical safety legal reform, and increased investment in the solar energy industry.

== See also ==
- Thoreau Center for Sustainability
- United States Agency for International Development
