= Scott Wallace (politician) =

American politician

Member of the New Hampshire House of Representatives from the Rockingham 33rd district
- In office December 7, 2016 – December 5, 2018

Member of the New Hampshire House of Representatives from the Rockingham 12th district
- In office December 5, 2018 – December 7, 2022

Member of the New Hampshire House of Representatives from the Rockingham 8th district
- Incumbent
- Assumed office December 7, 2022

Personal details
- Party: Republican

Scott Wallace is an American politician. He serves as a Republican member for the Rockingham 8th district of the New Hampshire House of Representatives.
