= Mark Ritchie (politician) =

American politician

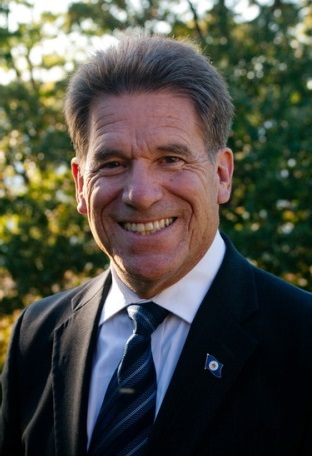
- Richie in 2011

Secretary of State of Minnesota
- In office January 2, 2007 – January 6, 2015
- Governor: Tim Pawlenty; Mark Dayton
- Preceded by: Mary Kiffmeyer
- Succeeded by: Steve Simon

Personal details
- Born: Donald Mark Ritchie; December 21, 1951 (age 74) Georgia, U.S.
- Party: Democratic
- Spouse: Nancy Gaschott
- Education: Iowa State University; University of Minnesota (BA, MPA)

Donald Mark Ritchie (born December 21, 1951) is an American politician and a former Minnesota secretary of state. Ritchie was elected the 21st Minnesota secretary of state on November 7, 2006. He was re-elected in 2010.

He co-chairs the Minnesota USA Expo Bid Committee, serves as the Civilian Aide to the Secretary of the Army for Minnesota, and was the President of Global Minnesota from 2019-2022. He is a member of the Democratic-Farmer-Labor Party.

He was born in Georgia, lived in Pennsylvania, Florida, Maryland, Iowa, Alaska, and graduated from high school in Iowa. He graduated from Iowa State University in 1971 and from the Humphrey School of Public Affairs at the University of Minnesota in 2013. He and his wife, Nancy Gaschott, have lived in Minnesota since 1980.

== Early life and career ==
From 1986 until 2006, Ritchie served as the president of the Minneapolis-based Institute for Agriculture and Trade Policy, a non-profit organization working with businesses, churches, farm organizations, and civic groups to foster long-term sustainability for Minnesota's rural communities. Among other issues, it looked into how global trade rules impact family farmers and rural communities. He also founded the League of Rural Voters.

In 1994, Ritchie was a co-founder of the Global Environment & Trade Study, located at Yale University, which conducted research on the linkages and potential synergies between international trade and the environment. That year, he launched a series of conferences to commemorate the 50th anniversary of the major post-Second World War global institutions, including the World Bank, the IMF, the United Nations, The Food and Agriculture Organization, and the Human Rights Commission. The 1994 conference, held at the Mt. Washington Hotel, featured a return of many of the "old timers" who had attended the original 1944 Bretton Woods Conference and other founders of the postwar economic system.

In 2000 during the presidential election, Ritchie was one of 52 farm and rural activists who formed "Family Farmers' National Alliance for Nader/LaDuke" to support the presidential campaign of Ralph Nader.

In 2004, Ritchie took a leave of absence from the Institute to lead National Voice, a national coalition of non-partisan organizations from across the country made up of church, business, and community organizations. National Voice included over 400 Minnesota organizations that formed the Minnesota Participation Project. The national media campaign called "November 2" and the constituent organizations helped voters find new ways to get involved in the elections. Their goal was to register and turn out over 5 million new voters nationwide. As part of this work, he appeared on The Daily Show with Jon Stewart on Election Night 2004.

Ritchie was asked in 2005 to testify before the Midwest Regional Hearing of the National Commission On The Voting Rights Act about the importance of voting and the challenges minority voters faced in 2004.

Ritchie was re-elected as secretary of state on November 2, 2010, defeating Republican challenger, former state representative and Minority Whip Dan Severson in a close race. He had announced he would not seek a third term.

== Secretary of State ==
Mark Ritchie was elected Minnesota's secretary of state in the November 2006 general election. He was supported by the Secretary of State Project, a progressive organization formed in response to the 2000 presidential election.

In 2008, Ritchie presided over the most publicly scrutinized recount in the history of the United States Senate, the election contest of Al Franken and Norm Coleman. The Minnesota Supreme Court unanimously supported the conclusions of the recount.

Ritchie is also widely credited with increasing the number of overseas military voters in Minnesota elections.

In 2007, Ritchie initially denied knowing how his campaign received a list of e-mail addresses of participants in a state-sponsored program. The list was used to send a citizen an e-mail asking for political contributions. After an investigation by the Legislative Auditor of Minnesota he admitted that he personally transferred the list, which was publicly available, to his campaign. State Republican leaders, citing inconsistencies from him regarding his role in his campaign's procurement of the list, called on him to resign. The Legislative Auditor determined that he had not broken any laws by allowing his campaign to use the e-mail list because it was public data. However, the Auditor did say that he "did not fulfill his legal obligation to make a full and timely response to a request for information from the Legislative Auditor," although he disputed this statement.

In January, 2011, he became the president of the century-old National Association of Secretaries of State, and was formally sworn in on February 12, 2011. His term, succeeding a predecessor who was defeated in the 2010 midterm elections, ends when the organization holds its summer meeting in West Virginia.

=== 2008 election ===
In Minnesota, the main duty of the secretary of state is running the state's elections. The 2008 elections were particularly busy for Ritchie and his staff. The Secretary of State's office oversaw the November 2008 general election, in which a record number of votes were cast, a statewide recount in a primary race for the Minnesota Supreme Court, recounts in the general elections contest of several state legislative races, and the disputed and highly publicized U.S. Senate race.

The 2008 U.S. Senate race initially had a margin of 206 votes separating incumbent Republican senator Norm Coleman and Democratic challenger Al Franken, out of almost three million votes cast. The narrow margin in this election mandated a statewide recount of all ballots. The recount was run by the nonpartisan Minnesota Canvassing Board which was chaired by Ritchie, and included Minnesota Supreme Court Chief Justice Eric Magnuson, Minnesota Supreme Court Justice G. Barry Anderson, Ramsey County District Court Chief Judge Kathleen Gearin, and Assistant Chief Judge Edward Cleary. Some conservative commentators accused Ritchie of bias during the Senate recount, saying the fact that he accepted contributions and an endorsement from ACORN during his 2006 campaign compromised his integrity as secretary of state. Most Minnesotans were generally supportive of Ritchie, the canvassing board, and the way that election and recount were handled, as shown by polls taken at the time and statements from public figures, including Republicans such as Governor Tim Pawlenty and previous Secretary of State Mary Kiffmeyer.

=== 2012 ballot title naming ===
Minnesota Statute 204D.15, with lineage dating back to 1919, requires the secretary of state shall provide an "appropriate title" for constitutional amendments. The first proposed constitutional amendment in 2012 required voters to present valid government approved photographic identification; absentee voters be subject to substantially equivalent identity and eligibility verification, in person voters without valid government approved photographic identification would be allowed to submit a provisional ballot which would not be cast until eligibility verification is complete. The legislature gave the amendment the name "Photo identification required for voting." The second constitutional amendment defined marriage as being only between one man and one woman and was named "Shall the Minnesota Constitution be amended to provide that only a union of one man and one woman shall be valid or recognized as a marriage in Minnesota?" by the legislature. Secretary of State Mark Ritchie, fulfilling his statutorial responsibility, provided titles for the constitutional amendments: "Changes to in-person and absentee voting and voter registration; provisional ballots" and "Limiting the status of marriage to opposite sex couples." As a result, critics accused Ritchie of attempting to influence the outcome of the ballot measures, the state legislature began crafting legislation to remove his office's responsibility to name ballot titles and Republican lawmakers filed a lawsuit against him. An amicus brief was filed by 19 law professors, who had a broad range of opinions on the amendments, stating that neither the secretary of state nor the attorney general has "exceeded their respective broad discretionary powers under statute to choose and approve an appropriate ballot title".

On Monday, August 28, 2012, the Minnesota Supreme Court ruled in favor of Republicans and retained the original titles of both ballot measures.

== Election results ==
2006 Minnesota Secretary of State
Party	Candidate	Votes	%	±%
Democratic (DFL)	Mark Ritchie	1,049,432	49.09	+4.58
Republican	Mary Kiffmeyer	943,989	44.16	−3.40
Independent	Bruce Kennedy	78,522	3.67	
Independence	Joel Spoonheim	64,489	3.02	−1.77
Independent	Write-ins	1,211	0.06	0.00

2010 Minnesota Secretary of State
Party	Candidate	Votes	%	±%
Democratic (DFL)	Mark Ritchie	999,382	49.10	
Republican	Dan Severson	928,913	45.64	
Independence	Jual Carlson	105,675	5.19	

== See also ==
- Politics of Minnesota

Party political offices
Preceded by Hubert Humphrey IV	Democratic nominee for Minnesota Secretary of State; 2006, 2010	Succeeded by Steve Simon
Political offices
Preceded by Mary Kiffmeyer	Secretary of State of Minnesota; 2007–2015	Succeeded by Steve Simon
