= Nick Hanauer =

American entrepreneur and venture capitalist

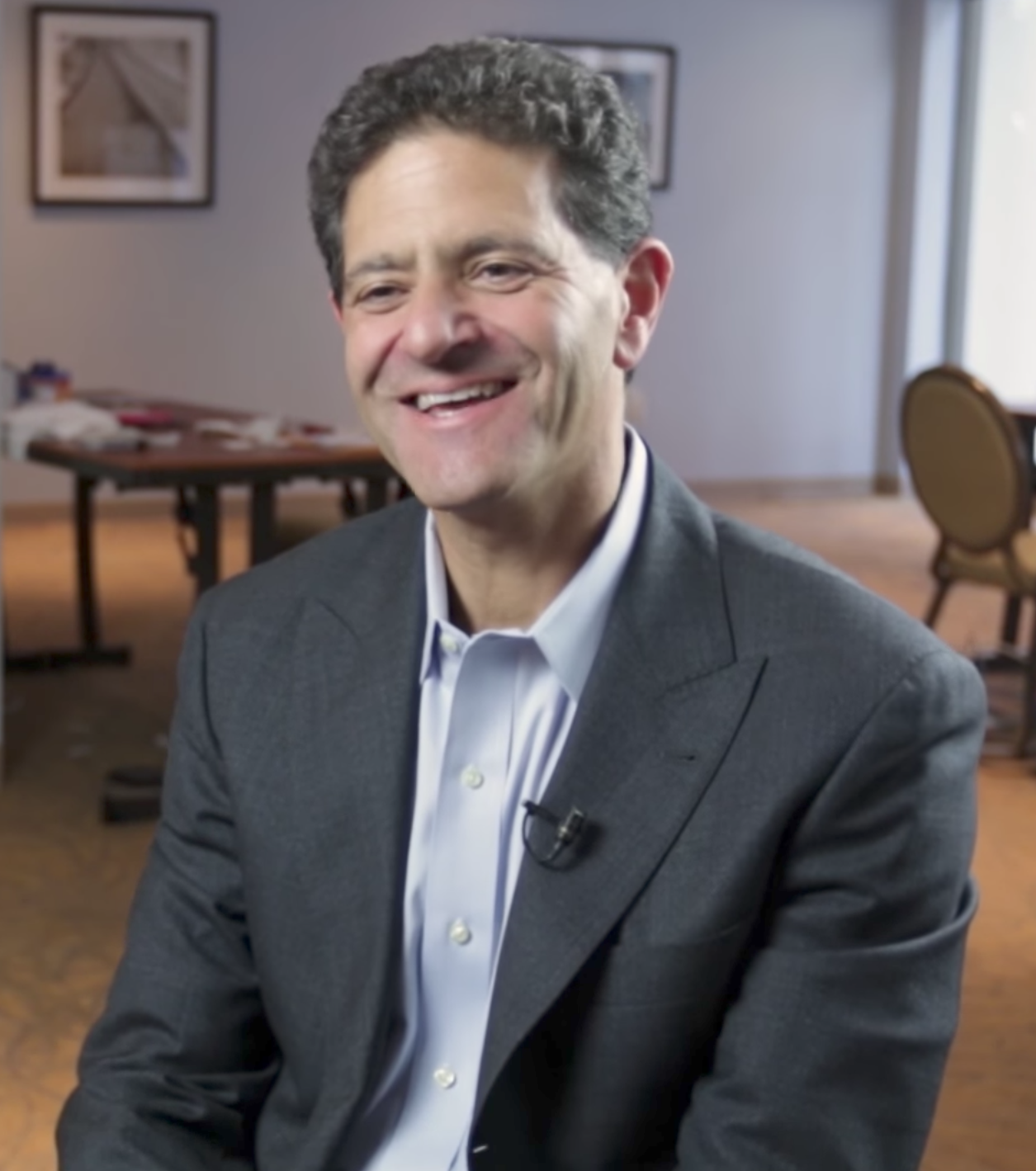
- Hanauer in 2016
- Born: September 2, 1959 (age 67); New York, New York, U.S.
- Education: University of Washington (BA)
- Occupations: Author, entrepreneur, venture capitalist
- Spouse: Leslie Hanauer
- Children: 2
- Relatives: Adrian Hanauer (brother)
- Website: www.nickhanauer.com

Nicolas Joseph Hanauer (born September 2, 1959) is an American entrepreneur, venture capitalist, and civic activist.

== Business career ==
Hanauer was born to a secular Jewish family in New York City and raised in Bellevue, Washington. His brother is Adrian Hanauer, a majority owner of Seattle Sounders FC and a minority owner of the Seattle Kraken. After earning a philosophy degree from the University of Washington, Hanauer began to work at the Hanauer family-owned Pacific Coast Feather Company, where he served as co-chair and CEO. In the 1980s, he co-founded Museum Quality Framing Company, a large West Coast franchise.

In the 1990s, Hanauer was the first non-family investor in Amazon.com, serving as an advisor until 2000. He founded gear.com, which eventually merged with Overstock.com, and Avenue A Media, which was acquired by Microsoft in 2007 (under the name aQuantive) for $6.4 billion. He has managed, founded, or financed over 30 companies across a broad range of industries including manufacturing, retailing, e-commerce, digital media and advertising, software, aerospace, healthcare, and finance, including Insitu Group (purchased by Boeing for $400 million) and Market Leader (purchased by Trulia in 2013 for $350 million).

In 2000, Hanauer co-formed the Seattle-based venture capital company Second Avenue Partners, which "looks to invest in promising teams and transformational ideas in a wide range of areas including the internet, consumer and social media, software, and clean energy." The company advises and funds early-stage companies such as HouseValues, Qliance, and Newsvine.

In 2018, the brothers sold Pacific Coast Feather Company.

== Civic activism ==
Hanauer is co-founder of the True Patriot Network, a progressive think tank built upon the arguments he and Eric Liu presented in their 2007 book espousing patriotic progressivism, The True Patriot. and their 2011 follow-up, The Gardens of Democracy. Liu and Hanauer are credited with coining the term “middle-out economics,” which identifies the buying power of the middle class as the necessary ingredient for job creation and economic growth. In 2017, then-Canadian Prime Minister Justin Trudeau named Gardens of Democracy as one of “10 Books Everyone Should Read,” identifying it as “a much-needed call to action for citizens to embrace their roles in a democratic society.”

In 2013, Hanauer appeared in the Robert Reich documentary Inequality for All, arguing that “we need to replace trickle-down economics with middle-out economics” because “every place you look on Earth where you find prosperity, you find massive investments in the middle class and the poor—because at the end of the day, they are the true job creators.”

Hanauer is a vocal advocate of increasing the minimum wage across the U.S. In 2013, "as striking fast-food workers across the country began rallying around calls for $15 an hour, Hanauer and David Rolf, a labor leader, kicked off an organizing drive in the small airport community of SeaTac, Washington, that resulted in the country’s first law mandating a $15 minimum wage." In 2014, Hanauer was a member of Seattle's Income Inequality Advisory Group, which proposed an ordinance mandating a $15 per hour minimum wage; the city's leadership passed the ordinance. In 2016, Hanauer was the largest contributor to Washington State Initiative 1433, which supported "incrementally raising the state's minimum wage from $9.47 to $13.50 by 2020 and mandating employers to offer paid sick leave." n 2025, Hanauer proposed that the next Democratic presidential platform should include a $25 per hour national minimum wage, a $100,000 overtime threshold and a $500 per month child credit.

In June 2014, Hanauer wrote an op-ed for Politico magazine in which he foresaw pitchforks coming for his "fellow .01%ers" if they did not address the issue of increasing wealth inequality. He noted that if inequality were allowed to expand, the resulting unrest would destroy the middle class and damage the wealthy class. He compared the present to the period preceding the French Revolution in the 18th century. Hanauer continues this theme in his podcast, "Pitchfork Economics with Nick Hanauer."

In 2015, Hanauer founded Civic Ventures, "a group of political troublemakers devoted to ideas, policies, and actions that catalyze significant social change. By thinking, writing, and acting outside conventional political discourse, Civic Ventures drives the economic conversation and fundamentally alters the status quo in Seattle, Washington state, and the United States."

Hanauer and his wife Leslie co-manage the Nick and Leslie Hanauer Foundation "which focuses on public education and the environment, and additionally supports a variety of progressive causes locally and nationally." Their foundation has supported the Seattle Art Museum, Seattle Center Fund, Progress Alliance of Washington (whose vision is a "Washington State that is a healthy place to live with shared economic success and security, and a democracy that works for its people"), and Woodland Park Zoo. The couple has also supported the Seattle chapter of the United Way.

Hanauer is active in the Seattle community and Washington's public education system. He co-founded the League of Education Voters (LEV), a non-partisan political organization dedicated to improving the quality of public education in Washington. He also serves on the boards of Cascade Land Conservancy and The University of Washington Foundation.

In the wake of the Sandy Hook Elementary School shooting, Hanauer co-founded the Washington Alliance for Gun Responsibility, whose mission is to "put forward and support commonsense solutions to reduce gun violence." The organization has been the primary backer for several ballot Initiatives in Washington State: Initiative 594, which expanded state background check laws to all gun purchases; initiative 1491, which would authorize state courts to issue extreme risk protection orders to remove an individual's access to firearms; and initiative 1639, which sought to implement restrictions on the purchase and ownership of firearms, including raising the minimum age to purchase a gun to 21, adding background checks, increasing waiting periods, and enacting storage requirements.

=== TED Talk controversy ===
In May 2012, authors at National Journal, Time, and HuffPost reported that Hanauer's March 1, 2012, TED talk on inequality had not been published online by the organization. In his talk, Hanauer criticized what he called "an article of faith for Republicans"—namely that "if taxes on the rich go up, job creation will go down", saying:

Businesses and the rich do not create jobs. Jobs are created by a feedback loop between customers and businesses that is set in motion by consumers increasing their demand.

Thus, instead of further cutting taxes for wealthy people, the modus operandi of trickle-down economics, workers in the United States would be better served by policies designed to stimulate higher median income:

If lower income tax rates for the wealthy really worked we would be drowning in jobs, and yet unemployment and underemployment is at record highs.

As justification for not posting the talk, Chris Anderson, curator of TED, stated that he felt Hanauer's talk was "explicitly partisan" and included a number of arguments such as his "apparent ruling out of entreprneurial [sic] initiative as a root cause of job creation." Moreover, he said, the live TED audience had given the talk mediocre reviews. Huffington Post writer Jillian Berman expressed bewilderment, for TED had previously published talks by politicians like former U.S. Vice-president Al Gore and British Prime Minister David Cameron without hesitation.

TED reserves the right to post only the talks it considers to be most effective. Hanauer partially defended Anderson's decision in an interview with Sam Seder, saying he could understand that the position he offered in his talk might be controversial to the business community and that Anderson might have received disproportionate criticism for holding back the talk. The original presentation is available on YouTube.

Anderson later decided to add Hanauer's most recent and longer talk on a similar theme from TEDSalon NY2014. It was posted on August 12, 2014. Anderson also posted an explanation for his decision and showed himself and Hanauer "burying the hatchet.". His July 2019 talk, "The dirty secret of capitalism—and a new way forward," is available on the YouTube channel affiliated with TED. In the 2019 talk, Hanauer does not explicitly mention any political party but calls out the faults of “neo-liberal economic theory” that serves as “essentially a protection racket for the rich,” and instead proposes “a new economics” centered around “including more people in more ways” to foster “economic growth.”

== Selected publications ==
=== Books ===
- The True Patriot (with Eric Liu), Sasquatch Books, 2007.
- The Gardens of Democracy (with Eric Liu), Sasquatch Books, 2011.
- Corporate Bulls*t, (with Joan Walsh and Donald Cohen), The Free Press, 2023.
- Markets Built for Humans, (with Eric Beinhocker), Middle Out Center, 2026
