= Wartime sexual violence =

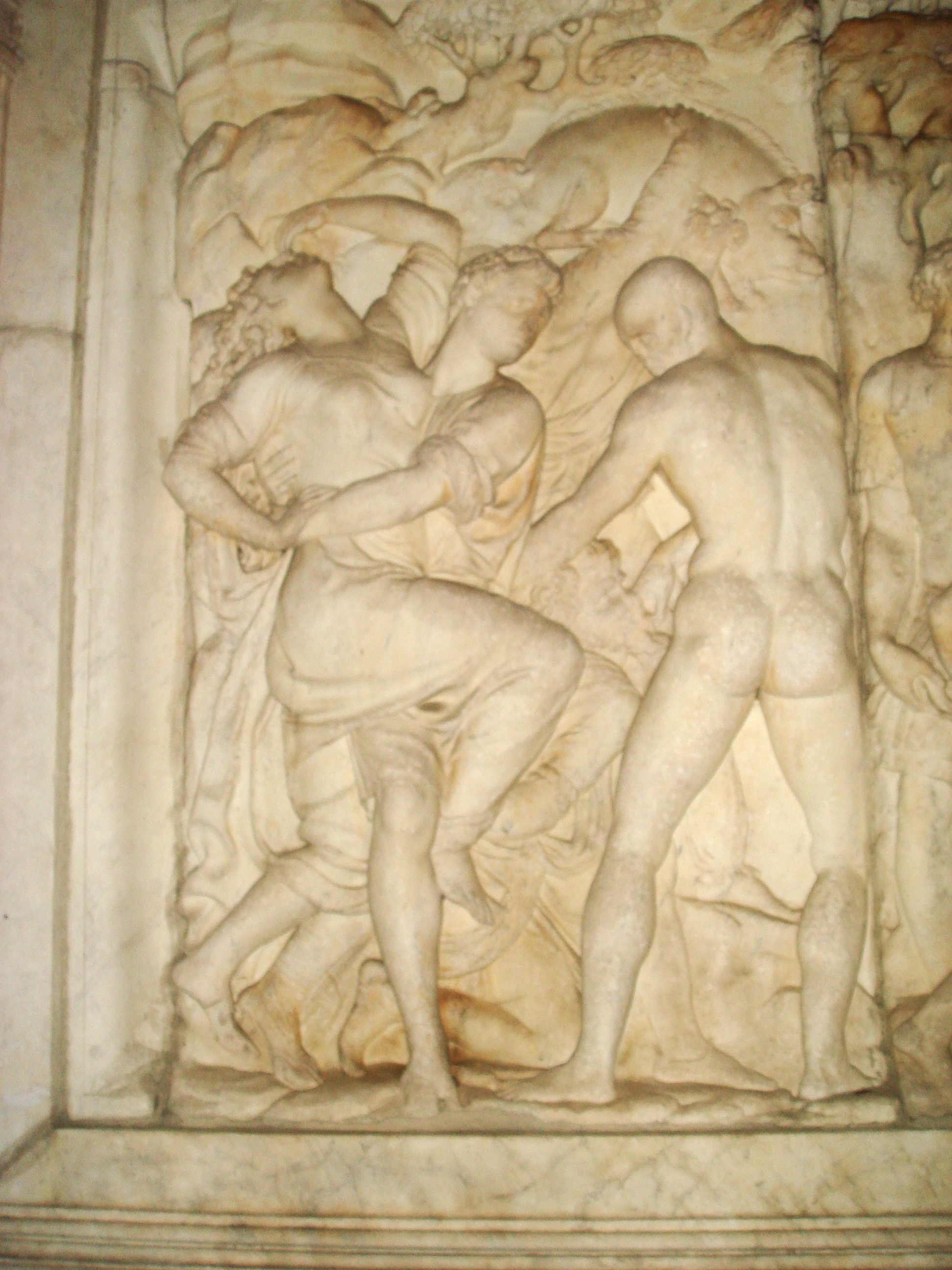
Monument to the Condottiero Giovanni dalle Bande Nere depicting a man kidnapping a woman (Piazza San Lorenzo, Florence)

Wartime sexual violence is rape or other forms of sexual violence committed by combatants during an armed conflict, war, or military occupation. This type of violence is often committed as spoils of war, but in the case of ethnic conflict, the phenomenon has broader sociological motivations. During periods of armed conflict, cases of sexual violence may encompass a range of behaviors, including gang rape and rape with the use of objects. It is distinct from sexual harassment and sexual assaults and rape committed amongst troops in military service.

During war and armed conflict, rape is frequently used as a means of psychological warfare in order to humiliate and terrorize the enemy. Wartime sexual violence may occur in a variety of situations, including institutionalized sexual slavery, wartime sexual violence associated with specific battles or massacres, as well as individual or isolated acts of sexual violence.

Rape can also be recognized as genocide when it is committed with the intent to destroy, in whole or in part, a targeted group. International legal instruments for prosecuting perpetrators of genocide were developed in the 1990s, and the Akayesu case of the International Criminal Tribunal for Rwanda, between the International Criminal Tribunal for Yugoslavia and itself, which themselves were "pivotal judicial bodies [in] the larger framework of transitional justice", was "widely lauded for its historical precedent in successfully prosecuting rape as an instrument of genocide".

According to the Rome Statute of the International Criminal Court (ICC), the following acts are classified as crimes against humanity and as war crimes: rape, sexual slavery, enforced prostitution, forced pregnancy, enforced sterilization, or any other form of sexual violence of comparable gravity.

== Definition ==
There is no consensus definition of wartime sexual violence, as there is variance in what forms of violence are included in the definition and variance in which violence is considered conflict-related. The terms rape, sexual assault and sexual violence are frequently used interchangeably. The Explanatory Note of the Rome Statute, which binds the International Criminal Court, defines rape as follows:

The perpetrator invaded the body of a person by conduct resulting in penetration, however slight, of any part of the body of the victim or of the perpetrator with a sexual organ, or of the anal or genital opening of the victim with any object or any other part of the body.

and

The invasion was committed by force, or by threat of force or coercion, such as that caused by fear of violence, duress, detention, psychological oppression or abuse of power, against such person or another person, or by taking advantage of a coercive environment, or the invasion was committed against a person incapable of giving genuine consent.

The concept of "invasion" is intended to be broad enough to be gender-neutral and the definition is understood to include situations where the victim may be incapable of giving genuine consent if affected by natural, induced or age-related incapacity.

A prominent data-set on conflict-related sexual violence, Sexual Violence in Armed Conflict (SVAC), builds on the ICC definition and covers seven forms of violence: "(a) rape, (b) sexual slavery, (c) forced prostitution, (d) forced pregnancy, (e) forced sterilization/abortion, (f) sexual mutilation, and (g) sexual torture". The data-set defines conflict-related sexual violence as the sexual violence committed by "armed actors (specifically, state militaries, rebel groups, and progovernment militias) during periods of conflict or immediately postconflict", thus excluding sexual violence by civilians. More expansive definitions may define wartime sexual violence as being committed even by civilians if the conflict creates a sense of impunity.

In 2009, the UN established a mandate and adopted SCR 1888 resolution 2009 to tackle conflict-related sexual violence (CRSV) as a peace and security issue and related violations. CRSV refers to rape, sexual slavery, forced prostitution, forced pregnancy, forced abortion, enforced sterilization, forced marriage, trafficking in persons when committed in situations of conflict for the purpose of sexual violence/exploitation and any other form of sexual violence of comparable gravity perpetrated against women, men, girls or boys that is directly or indirectly linked to a conflict.

== History of laws against sexual assault during war ==
Prosecution of rapists in war crime tribunals was rare prior to the late 1990s. Kelly Dawn Askin, the senior legal officer at the Open Society Foundation, argued that the lack of explicit recognition of war rape in international law or applicable humanitarian law can not be used as a defense by a perpetrator of war rape. Laws and customs of war prohibit offenses such as "inhuman treatment" or "indecent assaults", adding to this domestic military codes and domestic civil codes (national law) may make sexual assault a crime.

In 1999, humanitarian law concerned the maltreatment of civilians and "any devastation not justified by military necessity".

=== Pre-modern Europe ===
In the Middle Ages, the Catholic Church sought to prevent rape during feudal warfare through the institution of Peace and Truce of God (first proclaimed in 989) which discouraged soldiers from attacking women and civilians in general and through the propagation of a Christianized version of the chivalric ideal of a knight who protected innocents and did not engage in lawlessness.

In 1159, John of Salisbury wrote Policraticus in an attempt to regulate the conduct of armies engaged in "justifiable" wars. Salisbury believed that acts of theft and "rapine" (property crimes) should receive the most severe punishment, but also believed that obeying a superior's commands whether legal or illegal, moral or immoral, was the ultimate duty of the soldier.

Rape and pillage were prohibited by some army codes as early as the 14th century because of the tendency to create strong hostility in civilian populations and the detrimental effects to army discipline. Despite early efforts to systematize the laws of war, rape continued to be a problem in the 15th and 16th centuries. The influential writer Francisco de Vitoria stood for a gradual emergence of the notion that glory or conquest were not necessarily acceptable reasons to start a war. The jurist Alberico Gentili insisted that all women, including female combatants, should be spared from sexual assault in wartime.

It is suggested that one reason for the prevalence of war rape was that at the time, military circles supported the notion that all persons, including women and children, were still the enemy, with the belligerent having conquering rights over them. In the late Middle Ages, the laws of war even considered war rape as an indication of a man's success in the battlefield and "opportunities to rape and loot were among the few advantages open to ... soldiers, who were paid with great irregularity by their leaders ... triumph over women by rape became a way to measure victory, part of a soldier's proof of masculinity and success, a tangible reward for services rendered ... an actual reward of war".

During this period in history, war rape took place not necessarily as a conscious effort of war to terrorize the enemy, but rather as earned compensation for winning a war. There is little evidence to suggest that superiors regularly ordered subordinates to commit acts of rape. Throughout this period of history, war became more regulated, specific, and regimented. The first formal prosecution for war crimes did not take place until the late Middle Ages.

=== Early modern Europe ===
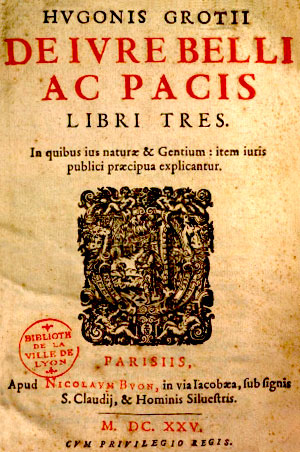
De jure belli ac pacis, title page from the first edition of 1625.

Hugo Grotius, considered the father of the law of nations and the first to conduct a comprehensive work on systematizing the international laws of war, De jure belli ac pacis (1625), concluded that rape (phrased as "the violation of women") "should not go unpunished in war any more than in peace", rejecting the view that it is permissible to inflict damage or harm "on anything belonging to the enemy":

The violation of women [in wartime] is variously regarded as permitted or not. Those who allow it consider only the injury done to the person, which they hold it agreeable to the law of arms to inflict on anything belonging to the enemy. The other opinion is better: it takes into account not only the injury but also the act of unbridled lust and concludes that something pertaining to neither safety nor punishment should be no more lawful in war than in peace. This latter view is not the law of all nations, but it is the law of the more respectable ones.

Emmerich van Vattel emerged as an influential figure when he pleaded for the immunity of civilians against the ravages of war, considering men and women civilians as non-combatants.

In the late 18th century and 19th century, treaties and war codes started to include vague provisions for the protection of women: The Treaty of Amity and Commerce (1785) specified that in case of war "women and children ... shall not be molested in their persons". Article 20 of the Order No. 20 (1847), a supplement to the US Rules and Articles of war, listed the following as severely punishable "Assassination, murder, malicious stabbing or maiming, rape". The Declaration of Brussels (1874) stated that the "honours and rights of the family ... should be respected" (article 38).

In the 19th century, the treatment of soldiers, prisoners, the wounded, and civilians improved when core elements of the laws of war were put in place by nations who were signatories to treaties. However, while the customs of war mandated more humane treatment of soldiers and civilians, new weapons and advanced technology increased destruction and altered the methods of war.

The Lieber Code (1863) was the first codification of the international customary laws of land war and an important step towards humanitarian law. The Lieber Code emphasized protection of civilians and stated that "all rape ... [is] prohibited under the penalty of death", which was the first prohibition of rape in customary humanitarian law.

=== 20th century ===
During the 20th century, international legal procedures attempted to prevent and prosecute perpetrators of war rape. Similarly, individual states developed laws pertaining to war rape's victims and perpetrators.

The prohibition of rape was excluded from the Geneva Conventions and was deliberately left vague by the Hague Conventions. Article 46 of the Hague Conventions of 1899 and 1907 regarding Land Warfare required only that "[f]amily honour and rights [and] the lives of persons ... must be respected" by the occupying powers.

After World War I, the Commission of Responsibilities, set up in 1919 to examine the atrocities committed by the German Empire and the other Central Powers during the war, found substantial evidence of sexual violence and subsequently included rape and forced prostitution among the violations of the laws and customs of war. Efforts to prosecute failed.

==== World War II ====
The Nuremberg and Tokyo Tribunals became the first international courts of real significance. The victorious Allied powers established them in 1945 and 1946 respectively to prosecute the major war criminals of the European Axis powers (in fact only Germans) and of Japan for crimes against peace, war crimes, and crimes against humanity. The possibility of prosecuting sexual violence as a war crime was present because of the recognition of war rape as serious violation of the laws of war in the Hague Conventions of 1899 and 1907 assertion that "[f]amily honour and rights [and] the lives of persons ... must be respected."

While the Nuremberg Tribunals failed to charge Nazi war criminals with rape, witnesses testified about it occurring. Several of the testimonies of victims of sexual violence during the Holocaust were by Jewish men and women. Previous war crimes trials had prosecuted for sex crimes, hence war rape could have been prosecuted under customary law and/or under the IMT (International Military Tribunals) Charter's Article 6(b): "abduction of the civilian population ... into slavery and for other purposes" and "abduction unjustified by military necessity". Similarly, it would have been possible to prosecute war rape as crime against humanity under Article 6(c) of the Nuremberg Charter: "other inhumane acts" and "enslavement". However, notwithstanding evidence of sexual violence in Europe during World War II, a lack of will led to rape and sexual violence not being prosecuted at the Nuremberg Tribunals.

According to at least 34 records, 140 European women were forced to prostitution during the German occupation of their countries, along with concentration camp female prisoners. In many cases, girls and women were abducted from the streets of occupied cities during German patrols.

The International Military Tribunal for the Far East did convict Japanese officers "of failing to prevent rape" in the Nanjing Massacre. The tribunal, in Tokyo, prosecuted cases of sexual violence and war rape as war crimes under the wording "inhumane treatment", "ill-treatment", and "failure to respect family honour and rights". According to the prosecution, in excess of 20,000 women and girls were raped during the first weeks of the Japanese occupation of the Chinese city of Nanjing. The War Crimes Tribunal in Tokyo included accounts of sexual violence crimes in the trial testimonies as well as public records. On a national level, a commander of the 14th Area Army, General Yamashita, was convicted for, inter alia, "rape under his command". Some 35 Dutch comfort women brought a successful case before the Batavia Military Tribunal in 1948.

It is well known that brutal mass rapes were committed against German women; both during and after World War II. According to some estimates, over 100,000 women were raped by Soviet soldiers in Berlin both during and after the Battle of Berlin. Historians estimate that over two million German women were raped following the country's surrender.

Rapes were also committed against allied nationals during the war; for example, Marocchinate (Italian for "Moroccan' deeds") is a term which is applied to the mass rape and killings of Italian civilians by the Moroccan Goumiers, colonial troops of the French Expeditionary Corps (FEC), commanded by General Alphonse Juin, after the Battle of Monte Cassino in Italy during World War II. It was estimated that 2,000 women and 600 men were raped and most of these crimes took place in the rural area between Naples and Rome.

Following World War II, the judges at the Nuremberg trials in 1946 stated that the laws of war only applied when committed between two opposing sides, not between allies, meaning such acts were not war crimes.

==== 1949 Geneva Conventions ====
Common Article 3 of the 1949 Geneva Conventions provides that "violence to life and person, in particular murder of all kinds, mutilation, cruel treatment and torture" and "outrages upon personal dignity, in particular humiliating and degrading treatment" are prohibited under any circumstance whatsoever with respect to persons who are hors de combat or who are not taking part of direct hostilities in non-international conflicts.

Article 27 of the 1949 Fourth Geneva Convention explicitly prohibits wartime rape and enforced prostitution of protected persons in international conflicts.

The prohibitions outlined in the 1949 Geneva Conventions were reinforced by the 1977 Additional Protocols I and II to the 1949 Geneva Conventions.

Article 4 of the Fourth Geneva Convention excludes civilians under their own national authority, nationals of a state not party to the convention, neutral persons living in the belligerent nation, and allied nationals from protection under the convention. Non-protected rape victims are instead protected by international human rights law to which their home or the offending foreign state may be a party to.

==== International Criminal Tribunal for Rwanda ====
In 1998, the International Criminal Tribunal for Rwanda established by the United Nations made landmark decisions defining genocidal rape (rape intended to affect a population or culture as a whole) as a form of genocide under international law. In the trial of Jean-Paul Akayesu, the mayor of Taba Commune in Rwanda, the Trial Chamber held that "sexual assault formed an integral part of the process of destroying the Tutsi ethnic group and that the rape was systematic and had been perpetrated against Tutsi women only, manifesting the specific intent required for those acts to constitute genocide."

Judge Navanethem Pillay, who went on to become the United Nations High Commissioner for Human Rights between 2008 and 2014, said in a statement after the verdict: "From time immemorial, rape has been regarded as spoils of war. Now it will be considered a war crime. We want to send out a strong message that rape is no longer a trophy of war." An estimated 500,000 women were raped during the 1994 Rwandan genocide.

Professor Paul Walters in his April 2005 statement of support of Pillay's honorary doctorate of law at Rhodes University wrote:

Under her presidency of the Rwanda Tribunal, that body rendered a judgment against the mayor of Taba Commune which found him guilty of genocide for the use of rape in "the destruction of the spirit, of the will to live, and of life itself."

The Akayesu judgement includes the first interpretation and application by an international court of the 1948 Convention on the Prevention and Punishment of the Crime of Genocide. The Trial Chamber held that rape (which it defined as "a physical invasion of a sexual nature committed on a person under circumstances which are coercive") and sexual assault constitute acts of genocide insofar as they were committed with the intent to destroy, in whole or in part, a targeted group, as such. It found that sexual assault formed an integral part of the process of destroying the Tutsi ethnic group and that the rape was systematic and had been perpetrated against Tutsi women only, manifesting the specific intent required for those acts to constitute genocide.

In September 1999, the United Nations published a "Report of the International Criminal Tribunal for the Prosecution of Persons Responsible for Genocide and Other Serious Violations of International Humanitarian Law Committed in the Territory of Rwanda and Rwandan Citizens Responsible for Genocide and Other Such Violations Committed in the Territory of Neighboring States between 1 January and 31 December 1994". The report states that on 2 September 1998, Trial Chamber I of the International Criminal Tribunal for Rwanda, composed of Judges Laïty Kama, Presiding, Lennart Aspegren and Navanethem Pillay, found Jean Paul Akayesu guilty of 9 of the 15 counts proffered against him, including genocide, direct and public incitement to commit genocide and crimes against humanity, murder, torture, rape, and other inhumane acts. The Tribunal found Jean Paul Akayesu not guilty of the six remaining counts, including the count of complicity in genocide and the counts relating to violations of Common Article 3 to the Geneva Conventions and of Additional Protocol II thereto. On 2 October 1998, Jean Paul Akayesu was sentenced to life imprisonment for each of the nine counts, the sentences to run concurrently. Both Jean Paul Akayesu and the Prosecutor have appealed against the judgement rendered by the Trial Chamber.

==== International Criminal Tribunal for the Former Yugoslavia ====
Rape first became recognized as a crime against humanity when the International Criminal Tribunal for the former Yugoslavia issued arrest warrants in 1993, based on the Geneva Conventions and Violations of the Laws or Customs of War. Specifically, it was recognized that Muslim women in Foča (southeastern Bosnia and Herzegovina) were subjected to systematic and widespread gang rape, torture and sexual enslavement by Bosnian Serb soldiers, policemen, and members of paramilitary groups after the takeover of the city (April 1992). The indictment was of major legal significance and was the first time that sexual assaults were investigated for the purpose of prosecution under the rubric of torture and enslavement as a crime against humanity. The indictment was confirmed by a 2001 verdict by the International Criminal Tribunal for the former Yugoslavia that rape and sexual enslavement are crimes against humanity. This ruling challenged the widespread acceptance of rape and sexual enslavement of women as intrinsic part of war. The International Criminal Tribunal for the former Yugoslavia found three Bosnian Serb men guilty of rape of Bosniak (Bosnian Muslim) women and girls (some as young as 12 and 15 years of age), in Foča, eastern Bosnia-Herzegovina. Furthermore, two of the men were found guilty of the crime against humanity of sexual enslavement for holding women and girls captive in a number of de facto detention centres. Many of the women subsequently disappeared. However, Justice Richard Goldstone, chief prosecutor at the International Criminal Tribunal for the former Yugoslavia, commented that "rape has never been the concern of the international community."

==== United States ====
United States law specifies that rape in wartime is punishable by death or imprisonment under Section d(g) of the War Crimes Act of 1996. However, a total ban on abortion is a requirement of US humanitarian aid for war victims, with no exceptions for rape, incest, or to save the life of the mother.

==== Rome Statute ====
The 1998 Rome Statute Explanatory Memorandum, which defines the jurisdiction of the International Criminal Court, recognizes rape, sexual slavery, enforced prostitution, forced pregnancy, enforced sterilization, "or any other form of sexual violence of comparable gravity" as crime against humanity if the action is part of a widespread or systematic practice.

=== 21st century ===
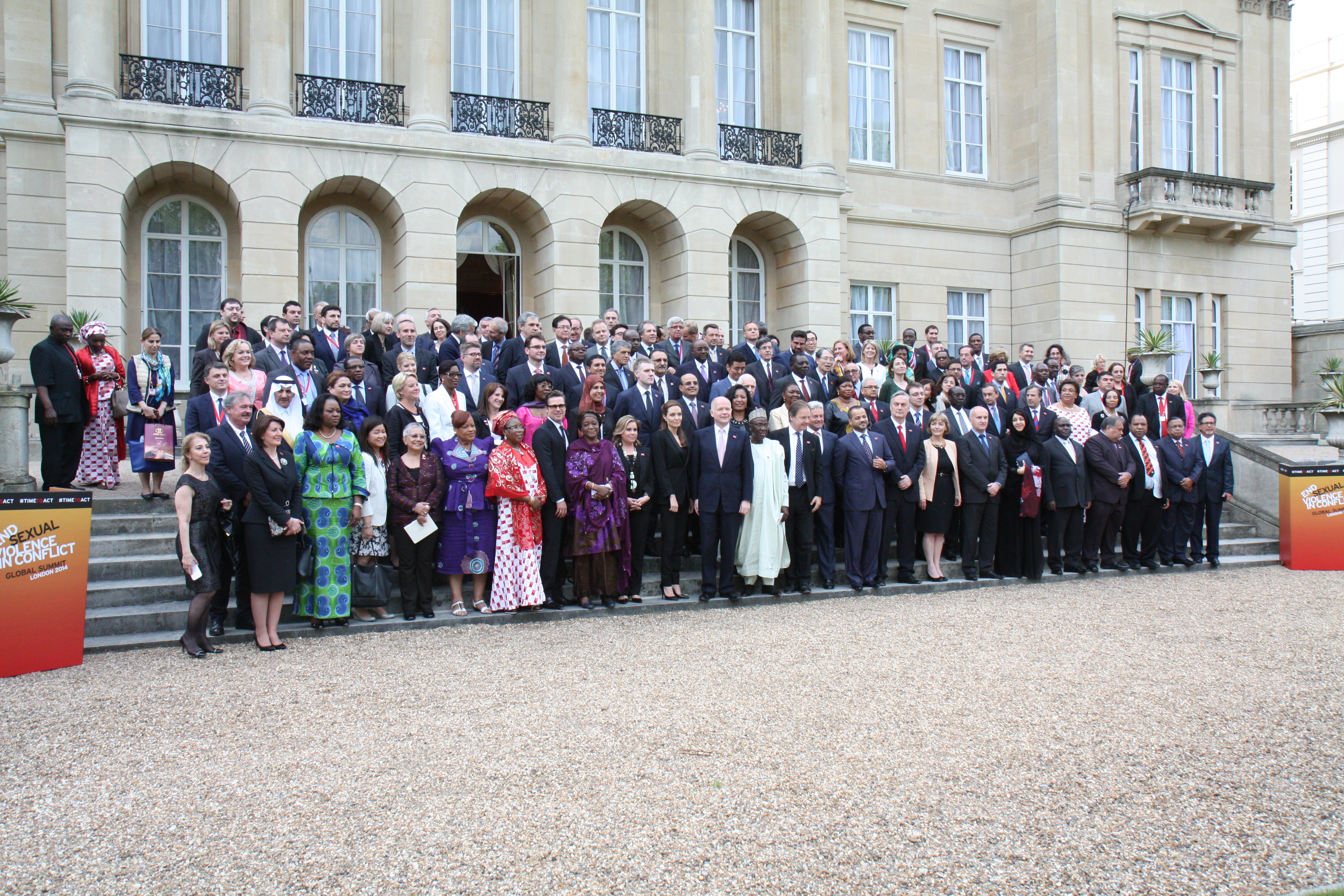
Some of the delegates to the Global Summit to End Sexual Violence in Conflict held in 2014

In 2008, the U.N. Security Council adopted resolution 1820, which noted that "rape and other forms of sexual violence can constitute war crimes, crimes against humanity or a constitutive act with respect to genocide".

The Office of the Special Representative of the Secretary-General on Sexual Violence in Conflict (SRSG-SVC) was established by Security Council Resolution 1888 (2009), one in a series of resolutions which recognized the detrimental impact that sexual violence in conflict has on communities, and acknowledged that this crime undermines efforts at peace and security and rebuilding once a conflict has ended. The office serves as the United Nations' spokesperson and political advocate on conflict-related sexual violence, and is the chair of the network UN Action against Sexual Violence in Conflict.

In April 2010, the first Special Representative, Margot Wallström of Sweden, established the Office and served as the United Nations' spokesperson and political advocate on this issue. In September 2012, Zainab Hawa Bangura of Sierra Leone took over as the Special Representative of the Secretary-General on Sexual Violence in Conflict.

The six priorities of the office are:

- to end impunity for sexual violence in conflict by assisting national authorities to strengthen criminal accountability, responsiveness to survivors and judicial capacity;
- the protection and empowerment of civilians who face sexual violence in conflict, in particular, women and girls who are targeted disproportionately by this crime;
- to mobilize political ownership by fostering government engagement in developing and implementing strategies to combat sexual violence;
- to increase recognition of rape as a tactic and consequence of war through awareness-raising activities at the international and country levels;
- to harmonise the UN's response by leading UN Action Against Sexual Violence in Conflict, a network of focal points from 13 UN agencies that amplify programming and advocacy on this issue in the wider UN agenda;
- to emphasize greater national ownership.

The Office has eight priority countries: Bosnia and Herzegovina; Central African Republic (CAR); Colombia; Côte d'Ivoire; Democratic Republic of Congo (DRC); Liberia; South Sudan and Sudan. While six of the eight priority countries are in Africa, this problem is widespread and the Office of the Special Representative is engaged on this issue in Asia and the Pacific (in Cambodia for residual cases from the Khmer Rouge period) and the Middle East (Syria).

=== 2010–present ===
In 2013, the U.N. Security Council unanimously passed Resolution 2122, which supported abortion rights for girls and women raped in wars, "noting the need for access to the full range of sexual and reproductive health services, including regarding pregnancies resulting from rape, without discrimination". United Nations Secretary General Ban Ki-moon had recommended to the U.N. Security Council earlier in 2013 (in September) that girls and women raped in war should have access to "services for safe termination of pregnancies resulting from rape, without discrimination and in accordance with international human rights and humanitarian law". In March 2013, Ban Ki-moon had also recommended to the Council that women raped in war have access to abortion services.

Sexual violence against women in 21st-century warfare remains a major issue in various conflicts worldwide, including but not limited to the Syrian Civil War, conflicts in the Democratic Republic of Congo, and the ongoing conflict in Yemen; women continue to be subjected to rape, sexual slavery, and other forms of gender-based violence.

In the Yazidi genocide, ISIS perpetrated widespread violence against women, subjecting them to systemic sexual slavery, rape, and brutal forms of abuse, underscoring the heinous nature of their crimes against the Yazidi community.

There is evidence of sexual violence performed against Palestinians by the Israeli Defense Force and Israeli settlers both before and after the Al Aqsa Flood on October 7, 2023.

In a declassified August 15, 1949, Israeli military document reported on by Haaretz, a platoon commander identified only as Moshe chronicles sexualized violence in a letter correspondence to his superiors: "In my patrol on 12.8.49 I encountered Arabs in the territory under my command, one of them armed. I killed the armed Arab on the spot and took his weapon. I took the Arab female captive. On the first night the soldiers abused her and the next day I saw fit to remove her from the world."

In the Israeli invasion of Gaza, a report published in February 2024 by the United Nations Office of the High Commissioner for Human Rights found credible evidence of "egregious human rights violations" perpetrated by the Israeli Defense Forces against Palestinian women and girls. The experts were "shocked by reports of ... deliberate targeting and extrajudicial killing" of Palestinian women and girls in Gaza. The report condemned the "arbitrary detention" of women and children who were subjected to "inhuman and degrading treatment", including rape, strip searches, threats of sexual violence, and other forms of sexual and psychological abuse such as withholding of food and medical treatment.

== Causes ==
Wars and civil conflicts can create a "culture of violence" or a "culture of impunity" towards human rights abuses of civilians. During periods of armed conflict, there are structures, actors, and processes at a number of levels that affect the likelihood of violence against civilians. Sexual violence is one of many types of violence directed against civilians in wartime situations.

Among some armies, looting of civilian areas is considered a way for soldiers to supplement their often meager income, which can be unstable if soldiers are not paid on time. Some militias that cannot afford to adequately pay their troops promote pillaging as a compensation for victory, and rape of civilians can be seen as a reward for winning battles.

According to UNICEF, "systematic rape is often used as a weapon of war in ethnic cleansing," having been used in various armed conflicts throughout the twentieth century alone, including Bosnia and Herzegovina, Cambodia, Uganda, and Vietnam. In 2008, the United Nations Security Council argued that "women and girls are particularly targeted by the use of sexual violence, including as a tactic of war to humiliate, dominate, instil fear in, disperse and/or forcibly relocate civilian members of a community or ethnic group."

Inger Skjelsbæ carried out a review of 140 publications explaining wartime sexual violence. She argues that explanations must take account of the increased general risk of rape, that certain groups of women are at more risk of rape, and that men are raped. She distinguishes three classes of explanations of rape: essentialist, that view rape during war as an intrinsic part of male behavior; structuralist, that view rape as having a political component; and social constructionist, that view rape as having a particular meaning depending on context. In the structuralist framework, rape may be seen as a form of torture designed to destroy a woman's identity as a woman within a particular culture, or to destroy an ethnic community itself. She cites examples of women being raped in front of other civilians, and different groups of women being more likely to experience sexual violence. In the social constructionist framework, she cites work that argues that the act of sexual intercourse can be used to feminize one participant and masculinize another, so the rape of men can seem to damage the identity of those who are raped by feminizing them.

Dara Kay Cohen argues that some military groups use gang rape to bond soldiers and create a sense of cohesion within units, particularly when troops are recruited by force. Amnesty International argues that in modern conflicts rape is used deliberately as a military strategy. Amnesty International describes war rape as a "weapon of war" or a "means of combat" used for the purpose of conquering territory by expelling the population therefrom, decimating remaining civilians by destroying their links of affiliations, by the spread of AIDS, and by eliminating cultural and religious traditions. Gayatri Chakravorty Spivak characterizes "group rape perpetrated by the conquerors" as "a metonymic celebration of territorial acquisition".

Evidence provided by Cohen also suggests that some militaries that use child soldiers use rape as a maturation ritual to increase the tolerance of troops for violence, especially in patriarchal societies that equate masculinity with dominance and control. Some refugees and internally displaced people experience human trafficking for sexual or labour exploitation due to the breakdown of economies and policing in conflict regions. In some conflicts, rape is used as a means of extracting information to force women and girls to give up the location of arms caches. In discussing gang rape as a means of bonding among soldiers, Cohen discusses the viewpoint of "combatant socialization", in which military groups use gang rape as a socialization tactic during armed conflict. By using gang rape during armed conflict, militia group members:

1. Prompt feelings of power and achievement
2. Establish status and a reputation for aggressiveness
3. Create an enhanced feeling of masculinity through bonding and bragging
4. Demonstrate dedication to the group and a willingness to take risks

While war rape may not be an apparent tool or weapon of war, it does serve as a primary tool to create a cohesive military group.

== Justification ==
Some political and military leaders publicly suggested during the twenty-first century that wartime sexual violence is legitimate in the sense that it is humorous, insignificant in comparison to military deaths, or expected.

In January 2019, Ethiopian prime minister Abiy Ahmed stated, "So, if you're wondering what the proportion of Oromo in Tigray is, leave it for DNA to find out. [Hilarity in the audience] It's probably wrong to say this, but: those who went to Adwa, to fight, didn't just go and come back. Each of them had about 10 kids. [Loud laughter of the audience and applause]." On 21 March 2021, during the Tigray War that started in early November 2020, Abiy suggested that sexual violence in the war was insignificant compared to military deaths, stating, "The women in Tigray? These women have only been penetrated by men, whereas our soldiers were penetrated by a knife." An unnamed Ethiopian general was quoted by physical geographer Jan Nyssen as stating during early 2021 that, in the context of the Tigray War, rape during wartime was "expected", but should not happen in the presence of federal police or administrative officials. Peace researcher Alex de Waal interpreted the comments by the prime minister as Abiy "jok[ing] about" gang rape.

== Gender ==
=== Rape of women ===
Susan Brownmiller was the first historian to attempt an overview of rape in war with documentation and theory. Brownmiller's thesis is that "War provides men with the perfect psychological backdrop to give vent to their contempt for women. The maleness of the military—the brute power of weaponry exclusive to their hands, the spiritual bonding of men at arms, the manly discipline of orders given and orders obeyed, the simple logic of the hierarchical command—confirms for men what they long suspect—that women are peripheral to the world that counts." She writes that rape accompanies territorial advance by the winning side in land conflicts as one of the spoils of war, and that "Men who rape are ordinary Joes, made unordinary by entry into the most exclusive male-only club in the world."

An estimated 45 million plus civilians died during World War II. Male and female civilians may be subject to torture, but many studies show that war rape is more frequently perpetrated on women than men. This may be due to the reluctance of men to come forward with accusations of being raped, and also an institutional bias amongst NGOs, who frequently focus resources on female victims. However rape against women is also underreported. Perpetrators of sexual violence against women and children "commonly include not only enemy civilians and troops but also allied and national civilians and even comrades in arms."

The victims of war rape are usually "civilians", a category first recognized in the 19th century. Although war rape of women is documented throughout history, laws protecting civilians in armed conflict have tended not to recognize sexual assault on women. Even when laws of war have recognized and forbidden sexual assault, few prosecutions have been brought. According to Kelly Dawn Askin, the laws of war perpetuated the attitude that sexual assaults against women are less significant crimes, not worthy of prosecution. Until the early twenty-first century, war rape had been a hidden element of war. Human Rights Watch linked the hidden aspect to the largely gender-specific character of war rape – abuse committed by men against women. This gender-specific character has contributed to war rape being "narrowly portrayed as sexual or personal in nature, a portrayal that depoliticizes sexual abuse in conflict and results in its being ignored as a war crime."

"To the victor go the spoils" has been a war cry for centuries, and women classed as part of the spoils of war. Furthermore, war rape has been downplayed as an unfortunate but inevitable side effect of sending men to war. Also, war rape has in the past been regarded as a tangible reward to soldiers (who were paid irregularly), and as a soldier's proof of masculinity and success. In reference to war rape in ancient times, Harold Washington argues that warfare itself is imaged as rape, and that the cities attacked are its victims. He argues that war rape occurs in the context of stereotypes about women and men, which are part of the basic belief that violent power belongs to men, and that women are its victims.

=== Rape of men ===
The rape of men by other men is also common in war. A 2009 study by Lara Stemple found that it had been documented in conflicts worldwide; for example, 76% of male political prisoners in 1980s El Salvador and 80% of concentration camp inmates in Sarajevo reported being raped or sexually tortured. Stemple concludes that the "lack of attention to sexual abuse of men during conflict is particularly troubling given the widespread reach of the problem". Mervyn Christian of Johns Hopkins School of Nursing has found that male rape is commonly underreported.

According to a survey published in the Journal of the American Medical Association in 2010, 30% of women and 22% of men from the eastern part of the Democratic Republic of the Congo reported that they had been subject to conflict-related sexual violence. Despite the popular perception that rape during conflict is primarily targeted against women, these figures show that sexual violence committed against men is not a marginal occurrence. The lack of awareness for the magnitude of the rape of men during conflict relates to chronic underreporting. Although the physical and psychological repercussions from rape are similar for women and men, male victims tend to demonstrate an even greater reluctance to report their suffering to their families or the authorities.

A 2011 story in The Guardian reports on war rape in Uganda: "[rape] is usually denied by the perpetrator and his victim. … Survivors are at risk of arrest by police, as they are likely to assume that they're gay – a crime in this country and in 38 of the 53 African nations. They will probably be ostracised by friends, rejected by family and turned away by the UN and the myriad international NGOs that are equipped, trained and ready to help women. … Often, [Salome Atim] says wives who discover their husbands have been raped decide to leave them. 'They ask me: "So now how am I going to live with him? As what? Is this still a husband? Is it a wife?" They ask, "If he can be raped, who is protecting me?"'"

Sexual violence against men weaponizes ideas of gender and sexuality against victims, causing tremendous physical and mental pain to victims. This weaponization can be especially damaging within conservative social environments in which homosexual intercourse – regardless of consent – is punished harshly. For example, some Ugandan male rape victims have not spoken out for fear of being branded as homosexual. As homosexuality is widely condemned in Uganda, male victims of sexual violence often struggle to get proper support because they are accused of being gay. In certain cases, gender roles concerning violence and sexual conduct are so deeply ingrained that the mere existence of male rape is denied. In Nigeria, 81 percent of people are against human rights for homosexuals. A 2021 study showed that as a result, both victims and perpetrators justify the act as a form of spiritual security which will bring the perpetrators 'physical safety, material wealth or socio-political ascendancy.'

== Effects ==
=== Physical effects ===
A 2013 study lists the physical injury to the victims of war rape as traumatic injuries, sexually transmitted diseases, maternal mortality, unwanted pregnancies, unsafe abortions, and persistent gynecological problems are of major concern. Because war rapes take place in zones of conflict, access to emergency contraception, antibiotics, and abortion are limited. Infection with the human immunodeficiency virus (HIV) is not uncommon. In certain instances, women were taunted by soldiers with the threat of infection.

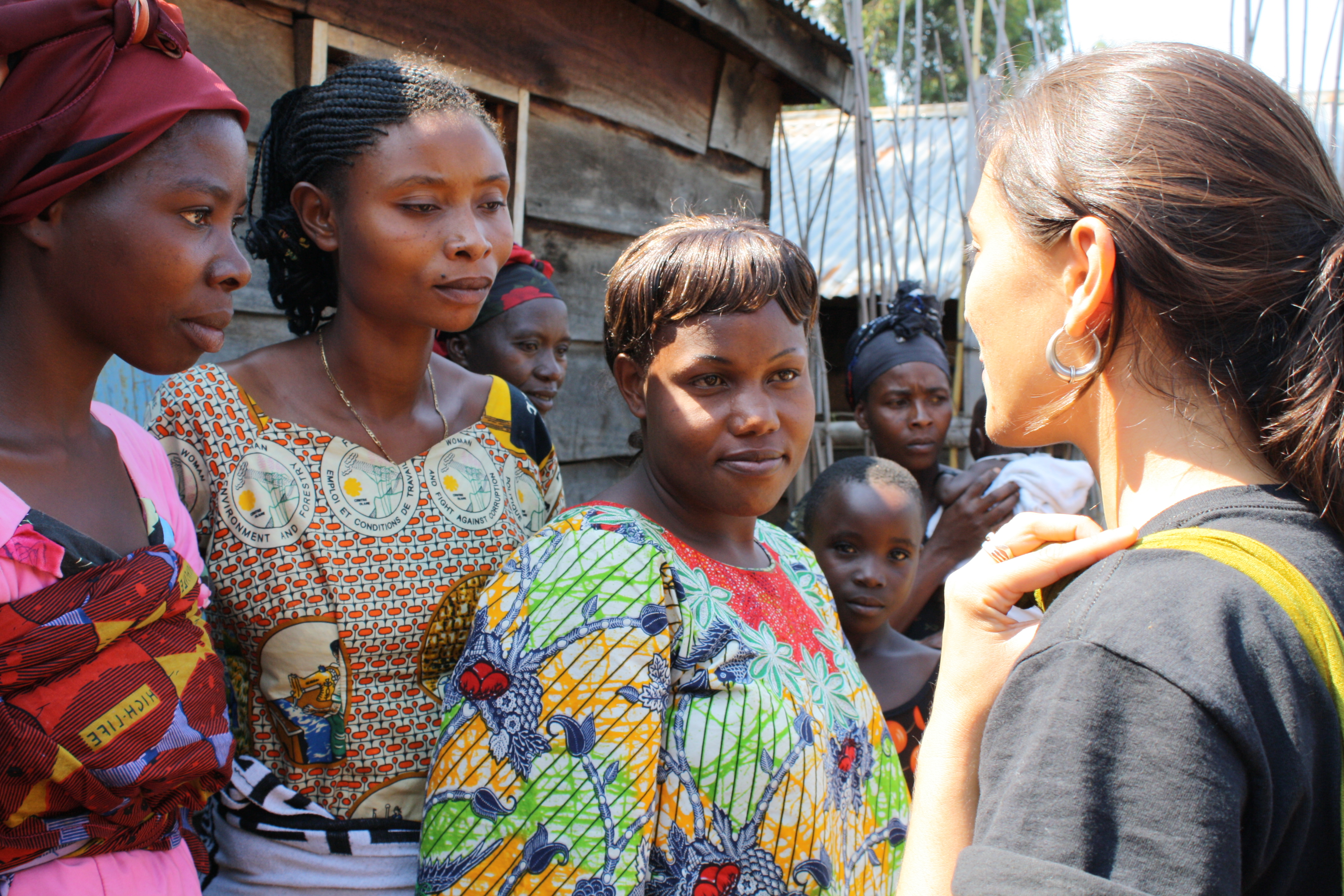
Psychosocial workers with International Rescue Committee (IRC) help rape survivors in South Kivu DRC in 2010.

War rape may include physical rape of the male organ. Gang rape and rape with human objects or physical objects, such as fists, sticks, rods, and gun barrels are also methods used in war rape. Women victims may suffer from incontinence and vaginal fistula as a result of these particularly violent forms of rape. In extreme instances of violent rape in war, the walls of the vagina are torn or punctured, resulting in severe pain and debilitating incontinence (urinary complications) and bowel containment.

Physical effects may also include bone breakage such as backbreaking and cranial cracks, causing future disability, visual and hearing impairment, and mental incapacitation.

=== Psychological effects ===
Victims and survivors of war rape are at very high risk of psychosocial problems.

The short-term psychological injuries to the victims include feelings of fear, helplessness, sadness, disorientation, isolation, vulnerability, and desperation. If left untreated, the psychological effects of sexual assault and rape can be devastating, sometimes even deadly. Causes of death as the result of sexual violence include suicide and murder. Murder of sexual assault and rape victims may be perpetrated by the rapist or as part of an honor killing by family members of the victim.

Long-term psychological injuries may include depression, anxiety disorders, post-traumatic stress disorder (PTSD), multiple somatic symptoms, flashbacks, on-going trauma, chronic insomnia, self-hatred, nightmares, paranoia, difficulty re-establishing intimate relationships, shame, disgust, anger, and persistent fears. They could have trouble sleeping, experience changes in their appetite, or develop full-blown emotional problems, including posttraumatic stress disorder, depression, substance abuse, or dependence. Individuals who have experienced sexual assault are at risk for other day-to-day problems, including arguing with family members and having problems at work. Lack of medical psychological support resources also puts victims of war rape at further disadvantage. Refugee women are also at a disadvantage of receiving adequate assistance to deal with the psychological consequences of war rape – not only do they lack legal representation, they also may lack protection from the perpetrators of the violent act. Furthermore, there is an increase in dislike of refugees and asylum seekers which is another obstacle in the psychological healing process of victims seeking assistance outside of their countries that may still be under civil strife. Psychological support and counseling sessions given by individuals not part of the ethnic, linguistic, or community may incite difficulties in communication between patient and caregiver. As a result, adequate emotional and psychological support to the victims is not fully developed, affecting the long-term healing potential for the patient.

=== Psychosocial and societal effects ===
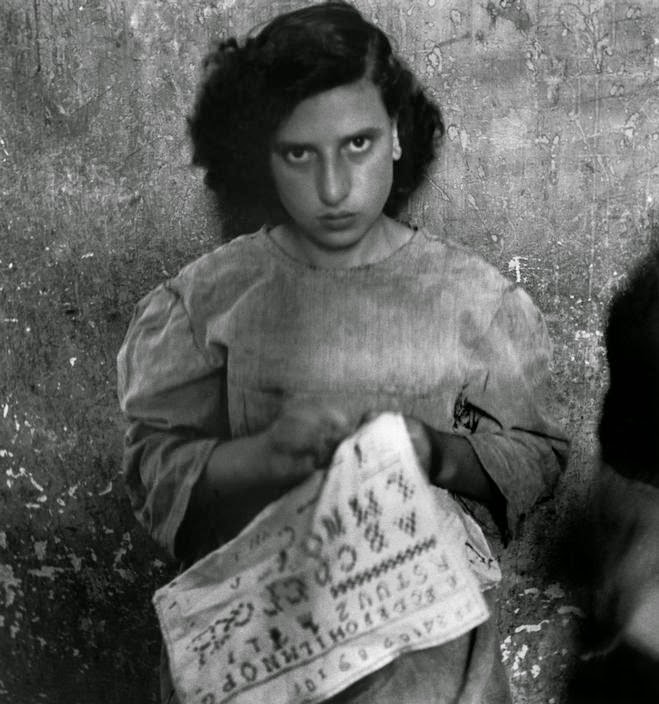
A girl, raped during the war, in the Albergo dei Poveri reformatory, Naples, Italy, 1948.

In addition to the physical and psychological damages resulting from rape, sexual violence in the context of war often disrupt the linkages between the rape victims and their communities. Thus, the phenomenon of war rape can structurally affect entire societies, which is closely linked to the logic underlying the strategic use of rape as an instrument in armed conflicts. Raping 'enemy' women also constitutes an act of abuse and humiliation against the men of the community the victims were representative of.

Research in 2019 suggests that wartime sexual violence may increase instances of intimate partner abuse in the affected society. A study on the aftermath of civil war in Peru estimated that in departments which had experienced conflict-related sexual violence, women in the department were at increased risk of intimate partner violence after the war.

Besides the psychosocial effects on women as the most frequent victims of wartime rape, children born of rape are faced with distinct social stigmas. The existence of taboos around the issue of war rape can also be an obstacle to post-conflict reconciliation.

==== Stigmatization and isolation ====
Psychosocial consequences of war rape describe how the linkages between victims and the society are altered as a result of sexual abuses during war. Both during and even more in the aftermath of conflict, when abuses become known, victims of war rape risk finding themselves in situations of social isolation, often abandoned by their husbands and rejected by their communities The ordeal is thus not over with the survival of the act of abuse but has a long-term effect that can only to a limited extent be dealt with by the victims themselves. The process of re-victimization captures how victims of sexual violence continue to "receive additional hurt after the direct cause of victimization has disappeared" with stigmatization and exclusion being among the main sources of re-victimization.

This is particularly relevant in patriarchal societies, where female sexuality is linked to male honour, virginity is a core value, and where a culture considers ethnicity transmitted through male genes. Given the ethnic dimension of sexuality, rape can become a means of ethnic cleansing or genocide, as has been claimed in relation to systematic instances of rape in Rwanda and Bosnia. In this context, "rape as a weapon of war is not an individual issue, but a societal one." In a number of countries, the targeted infection of women with HIV, which creates further suffering for victims experiencing social exclusion and discrimination for having HIV/AIDS.

==== Impact on children who are born as a result of rape ====
War rape can have an equally strong and a long-lasting effect on children who are born as a result of it. On the one hand, these children may not be immediately identified and as a result, they might not find out about their origins until they reach a later point in their lives. In turn, if the children themselves but even more importantly, if the community knows about the 'war babies', they risk being regarded as the 'other' by the communities into which they were born. Recurring patterns in countries which include Bosnia and Herzegovina, Uganda, Sierra Leone and Rwanda show how children who were born as a result of war rape and the mothers who do not want them both have to face struggles with regard to issues which are related to their identities – both in an administrative and a personal sense – and their rights are sometimes restricted, such as their right to obtain an education and their right to be protected from discrimination and physical harm. Unwanted children who were born as a result of rape are potentially more vulnerable in both a psychological and a physical way and cases of child abandonment have been reported in various contemporary conflict and post-conflict societies.

==== Impact on post-conflict reconciliation ====
The societal consequences of war rape can equally have a negative impact on post-conflict reconciliation and the judicial follow-up on wartime crimes, including rape. Given the stigmatisation of victims and their isolation or fear thereof, they might prefer to remain silent with regard to the violations they have suffered. Indeed, underreporting of cases of rape during armed conflict is a practical challenge post-conflict communities have to face that is pointed to by a number of actors, including the United Nations Secretary-General, the United Nations High Commissioner for Human Rights as well as international NGOs.

As Human Rights Watch reported with regard to war rape during the Rwandan genocide, victims "expressed dismay at the fact that they were being urged to forget what happened to them in the name of peace and reconciliation". The fear of consequences and threat of exclusion felt by the victims makes it difficult to establish clear figures of war rape incidents and to hold perpetrators accountable for the crimes they have committed, as has been claimed with regards to war rape in Darfur: "Underreporting of cases may be attributed to the stigma associated with rape, shame and fear of reprisal, denial that rape occurs, intimidation by many Government officials and the inability to access some conflict-affected areas". This points to another difficulty victims of war rape have to deal with at the societal level. The perpetrators of rape are often officials or otherwise affiliated with the state's institutions, which might make reporting of assaults appear useless.

=== Psychiatric care ===
Disrupted healthcare sectors is a term the World Health Organization describes for medical facilities that are destroyed or partially destroyed in war torn areas. Health care facilities are essential for the establishment of support systems for rape victims. Psychological support units are also hampered by the lack of material resources available to the medical community on-ground. Medical practitioners and health-care workers face daunting challenges in conflict and post-conflict area. As the WHO explains, "healthcare delivery fragments and deteriorates, memory and knowledge are eroded, and power disperses". War-torn societies in immediate post-conflict zones have broken medical infrastructure such as: destroyed or partially destroyed hospitals (or clinics); non-functioning hospitals; poor, scarce or inadequate medical supplies, lack of running water, and scarce or lack of electricity. Dismantling weapons from armed rebels and other groups are prioritized in immediate post-conflict situations which in effect de-prioritizes the immediate physical and psychiatric care that war rape victims are in urgent need of. "If we do not have the capacity to prevent war, we have a collective responsibility to better understand and treat its psychiatric, medical, and social consequences." Access to psychological health services further causes inequity for survivors of war rape who are at the margins of society living in chronic poverty or located in rural regions. Healthcare and psychiatric care is a key component to the healing processes of war rape.

== Impact ==
=== Former Yugoslavia ===
Evidence of the magnitude of rape in Bosnia and Herzegovina prompted the International Criminal Tribunal for the former Yugoslavia (ICTY) to deal openly with these abuses. The issue of rape during armed conflict was brought to the attention of the United Nations after the breakup of Yugoslavia in the early 1990s, in conjunction with the Bosnian war. Reports of sexual violence during the Bosnian War (1992–1995) and Kosovo War (1998–1999), part of the Yugoslav wars, a series of conflicts from 1991 to 1999, have been described as "especially alarming". During the Kosovo War thousands of Kosovo Albanian women and girls became victims of sexual violence by Serbian paramilitaries, soldiers or policemen. The majority of rapes were gang rapes. Following the entry of NATO in the Kosovo War, rapes of Serbian, Albanian, and Roma women were committed by ethnic Albanians. Rapes by members of the Kosovo Liberation Army have also been documented.

It has been estimated that during the Bosnian War between 20,000 and 50,000 women were raped. The majority of the rape victims were Muslim women raped by Serbian soldiers. Although men also became victim of sexual violence, war rape was disproportionately directed against women who were (gang) raped in the streets, in their homes and/or in front of family members. Sexual violence occurred in multiple ways, including rape with objects, such as broken glass bottles, guns and truncheons. War rape occurred as a matter of official orders as part of ethnic cleansing, to displace the targeted ethnic group out of the region.

During the Bosnian War, the existence of deliberately created "rape camps" was reported. The reported aim of these camps was to impregnate the Muslim and Croatian women held captive. It has been reported that often women were kept in confinement until the late stage of their pregnancy. This occurred in the context of a patrilineal society, in which children inherit their father's ethnicity, hence the "rape camps" aimed at the birth of a new generation of Serb children. According to the Women's Group Tresnjevka more than 35,000 women and children were held in such Serb-run "rape camps".

During the Kosovo War thousands of Kosovar Albanian women and girls became victims of sexual violence. War rape was used as a weapon of war and an instrument of systematic ethnic cleansing; rape was used to terrorize the civilian population, extort money from families, and force people to flee their homes. According to a 2000 Human Rights Watch report war rape in the Kosovo War can generally be subdivided into three categories: rapes in women's homes, rapes during flight, and rapes in detention. The majority of the perpetrators were Serbian paramilitaries, but they also included Serbian special police or Yugoslav army soldiers. Most rapes were gang rapes involving at least two perpetrators. Rapes occurred frequently in the presence, and with the acquiescence, of military officers. Soldiers, police, and paramilitaries often raped their victims in the full view of numerous witnesses.

==== Mass rape in the Bosnian War ====
During the Bosnian War, Bosnian Serb forces conducted a sexual abuse strategy against thousands of Bosnian Muslim girls and women which became known as a "mass rape phenomenon". No exact figures on how many women and children were systematically raped by the Serb forces in various camps were established, but estimates range from 20,000 to 50,000. Mass rape mostly occurred in eastern Bosnia (especially during the Foča and Višegrad massacres), and in Grbavica during the Siege of Sarajevo. Numerous Bosnian Serb officers, soldiers and other participants were indicted or convicted of rape as a war crime by the ICTY and the Court of Bosnia and Herzegovina. The events inspired the Golden Bear winner at the 56th Berlin International Film Festival in 2006, called Grbavica.

=== Rwandan genocide ===
During the Rwandan genocide, from April until July 1994, hundreds of thousands of women and girls were raped or became the victims of other forms of sexual violence. Although no explicit written orders to commit rape and other acts of sexual violence have been found, evidence suggests that military leaders encouraged or ordered their men to rape the Tutsis, and they also condoned the acts which were already taking place, without making efforts to stop them.

Compared to other conflicts, the sexual violence in Rwanda stands out in terms of the organised nature of the propaganda that contributed significantly to fuelling sexual violence against Tutsi women, the very public nature of the rapes and the level of brutality towards the women. Anne-Marie de Brouwer concludes that considering the massive scale and public nature of war rape during the Rwandan genocide, "it is difficult to imagine anybody in Rwanda who was not aware of the sexual violence taking place."

In 1998, the International Criminal Tribunal for Rwanda made the landmark decision that the war rape during the Rwanda genocide was an element of the crime of genocide. The Trial Chamber held that "sexual assault formed an integral part of the process of destroying the Tutsi ethnic group and that the rape was systematic and had been perpetrated against Tutsi women only, manifesting the specific intent required for those acts to constitute genocide."

In his 1996 report, the United Nations Special Rapporteur on Rwanda, Rene Degni-Segui stated that "rape was the rule and its absence was the exception." The report also stated that "rape was systematic and was used as a "weapon" by the perpetrators of the massacres. This can be estimated from the number and nature of the victims as well as from the forms of rape." A 2000 report prepared by the Organisation of African Unity's International Panel of Eminent Personalities concluded that "we can be certain that almost all females who survived the genocide were direct victims of rape or other sexual violence, or were profoundly affected by it".

The Special Rapporteur on Rwanda estimated in his 1996 report that between 2,000 and 5,000 pregnancies resulted from war rape, and that between 250,000 and 500,000 Rwandese women and girls had been raped. Rwanda is a patriarchal society and children therefore take the ethnicity of the father, underlining the fact that war rape occurred in the context of genocide.

Within the context of the Rwandan genocide, victims of sexual violence were predominantly attacked on the basis of their gender and ethnicity. The victims were mostly Tutsi women and girls, of all ages, while men were only seldom the victims of war rape. Women were demonized in the anti-Tutsi propaganda prior to the 1994 genocide.

The December 1990 issue of the newspaper Kangura published the "Ten Commandments", four of which portrayed Tutsi women as tools of the Tutsi community, as sexual weapons that would be used by the Tutsi to weaken and ultimately to destroy the Hutu men. Gender based propaganda also included cartoons printed in newspapers that portrayed Tutsi women as sex objects. Examples of gender based hate propaganda used to incite war rape included statements by perpetrators such as "You Tutsi women think that you are too good for us" and "Let us see what a Tutsi woman tastes like". Victims of war rape during the Rwandan genocide also included Hutu women considered moderates, such as Hutu women married to Tutsi men and Hutu women politically affiliated with the Tutsi. War rape also occurred regardless of ethnicity or political affiliation, with young or beautiful women being targeted based on their gender only.

Sexual violence against men occurred significantly less frequently, but it frequently included the mutilation of their genitals, which were often displayed in public. The perpetrators of war rape during the Rwandan genocide were mainly members of the Hutu militia, the "Interahamwe". Rapes were also committed by military personnel within the Rwandan Armed Forces (FAR), including the Presidential Guard, and civilians.

Sexual violence against women and girls during the Rwandan genocide included: rape, gang rape, sexual slavery (either collectively or individually through "forced marriages"), rape with objects such as sticks and weapons often leading to the victim's death, sexual mutilation of, in particular, breasts, vaginas or buttocks, often during or following rape. Pregnant women were not spared from sexual violence and on many occasions victims were killed following rape. Many women were raped by men who knew they were HIV positive and it has been suggested that there were deliberate attempts to transmit the virus to Tutsi women and their families. War rape occurred all over the country and it was frequently perpetrated in plain view of others, at sites such as schools, churches, roadblocks, government buildings or in the bush. Some women were kept as personal slaves for years after the genocide, and they were eventually forced to move to neighbouring countries after the genocide along with their captors.

The long-term effects of war rape in Rwanda on its victims include social isolation (the social stigma attached to rape meant that some husbands left their wives who had become victims of war rape, or that the victims became unmarriageable), unwanted pregnancies and babies (some women resorted to self-induced abortions), sexually transmitted diseases, including syphilis, gonorrhoea and HIV/AIDS (access to anti-retroviral drugs remains limited).

The International Criminal Tribunal for Rwanda, established in 1994 after the Rwandan Genocide, has only brought three perpetrators before the Tribunal, with the first conviction in 1998.

=== Sri Lankan Civil War ===
During the Sri Lankan Civil War, multiple Human Rights Organizations reported cases of rape, violence and disappearance of women in the 1990s, claiming to be committed by security forces. Government officials, including the president, have denied the claims and agreed to co-operate with the investigations and prosecute whomever they find guilty. The UN Special Rapporteur has reported that individual investigations and proceedings relating to these cases have commenced at the local magistrates courts.

Some of the notable cases of murdered raped victims and the massacres associated with the rape incidents are Krishanti Kumaraswamy, Arumaithurai Tharmaletchumi, Ida Carmelitta, Ilayathambi Tharsini, Murugesapillai Koneswary, Premini Thanuskodi, Sarathambal, Kumarapuram massacre and Vankalai massacre.

=== Philippines: Mindanao and Sulu ===
On 24 September 1974, in the Malisbong massacre, the Armed Forces of the Philippines slaughtered 1,766 Moro Muslim civilians who were praying at a Mosque in addition to mass raping Moro girls who had been taken aboard a boat.

=== Bangladesh: Chittagong Hill Tracts ===
In the Chittagong Hill Tracts Bengali settlers and soldiers have raped native Jumma (Chakma) women "with impunity" with the Bangladeshi security forces doing little to protect the Jummas and instead assisting the rapists and settlers.

=== Kashmir conflict ===
Numerous scholars and human rights agencies assert that since the onset of the insurgency in Jammu and Kashmir in 1988, rape has been leveraged as a 'weapon of war' by Indian security forces comprising the Indian Army, Central Reserve Police Force (CRPF) and Border Security personnel.

=== 21st century ===
According to Amnesty International, documented cases of war rape in the early twenty-first century include incidents in Afghanistan, Chechnya, Colombia, Iraq, Sudan, and Nepal. UNICEF has documented widespread rape in conflict areas and war zones.

=== Democratic Republic of the Congo ===
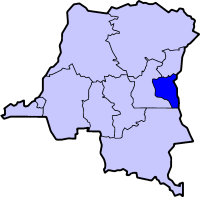
South Kivu Province in the Democratic Republic of the Congo

Democratic Republic of the Congo

In Eastern Congo, the prevalence and intensity of rape and other sexual violence is described as the worst in the world. A 2010 study found that 22% of men and 30% of women in Eastern Congo reported conflict-related sexual violence.

Since fighting broke out in 1998 tens of thousands of people have been raped in the Democratic Republic of Congo. It is estimated that there are as many as 200,000 surviving rape victims living in the Democratic Republic of the Congo today. War rape in the Democratic Republic of Congo has frequently been described as a "weapon of war" by commentators. Louise Nzigire, a local social worker, states that "this violence was designed to exterminate the population." Nzigire observes that rape has been a "cheap, simple weapon for all parties in the war, more easily obtainable than bullets or bombs." The rape of men is also common. Men who admit they were raped risk ostracism by their community, and criminal prosecution, because they may be seen as homosexual, which is a crime in 38 African countries.

Despite the peace process launched in 2003, sexual assault by soldiers from armed groups and the national army continues in the eastern provinces of the country. Evidence of war rape emerged when United Nations troops move into areas previously ravaged by war after the peace process started. Gang rape and rape with objects has been reported. The victims of war rape may suffer from incontinence and vaginal fistula as a result of particularly violent rape. Witness accounts include an instance of a woman who had the barrel of a gun inserted into her vagina, after which the soldier opened fire. Incontinence and vaginal fistula leads to the isolation of war rape victims from her community and access to reconstructive surgery is limited in the Democratic Republic of the Congo.

More than 500 rapes were reported in Eastern Congo in August 2010, leading to an apology from Atul Khare that the UN peacekeepers had failed to protect the population from brutalisation. In 2020 the UN reported that in the Democratic Republic of Congo, a young man from Tanganyika Province was stripped naked, raped, and coerced by the Twa militia to rape his own mother. Similar violence against men and boys while in detention were also reported.

=== Darfur region in Sudan ===
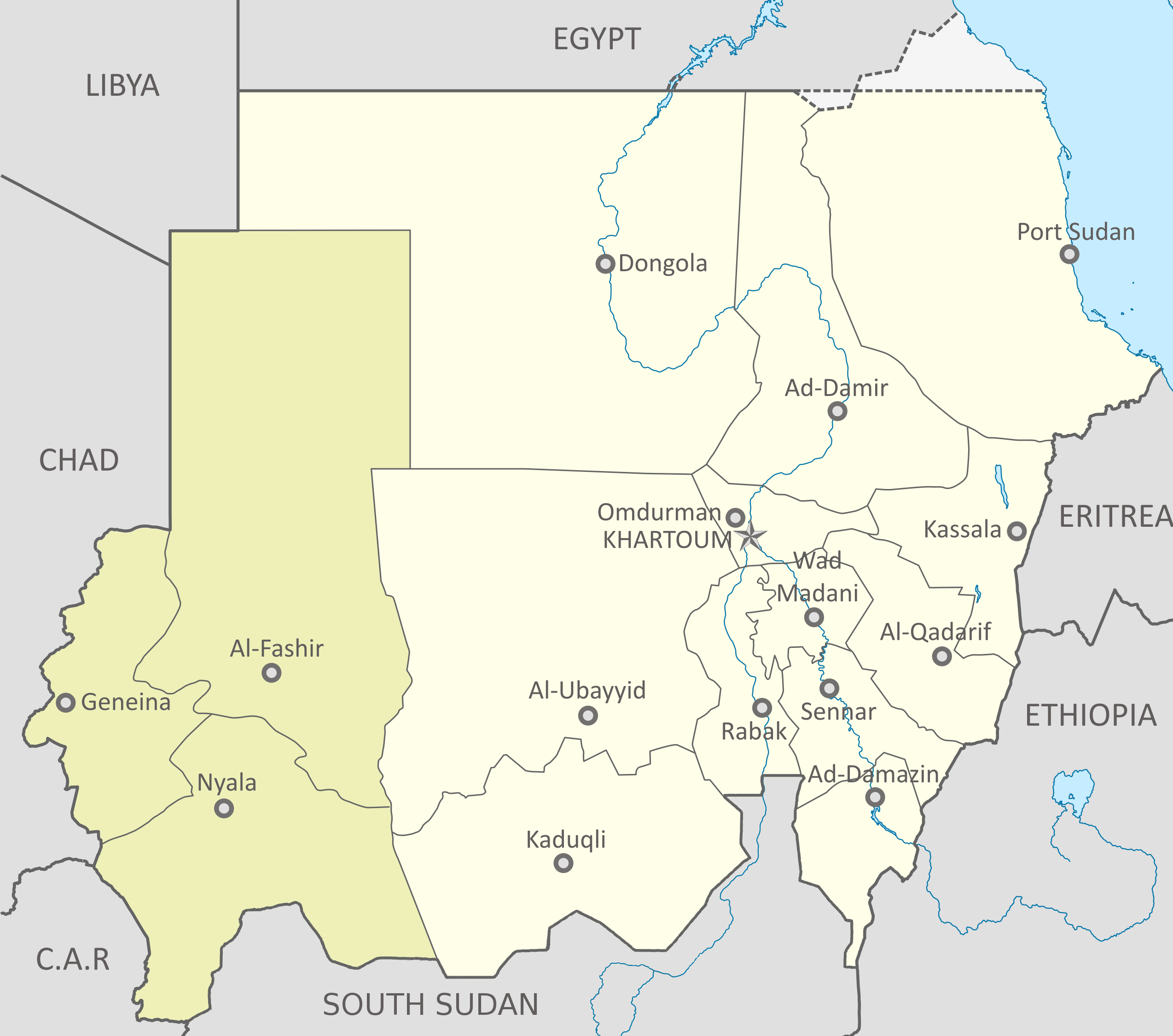
Map of Sudan. The Darfur region is shaded.

A 19 October 2004 UN News Centre article titled "UNICEF adviser says rape in Darfur, Sudan continues with impunity" reported:

Armed militias in Sudan's strife-torn Darfur region are continuing to rape women and girls with impunity, an expert from the United Nations children's agency said today on her return from a mission to the region. Pamela Shifman, the UN Children's Fund (UNICEF) adviser on violence and sexual exploitation, said she heard dozens of harrowing accounts of sexual assaults – including numerous reports of gang-rapes – when she visited internally displaced persons (IDPs) at one camp and another settlement in North Darfur last week. "Rape is used as a weapon to terrorize individual women and girls, and also to terrorize their families and to terrorize entire communities," she said in an interview with the UN News Service. "No woman or girl is safe."

In the same article Pamela Shifman was reported to have said that:

Every woman or girl she spoke to had either endured sexual assault herself, or knew of someone who had been attacked, particularly when they left the relative safety of their IDP camp or settlement to find firewood.

=== Iraq War ===
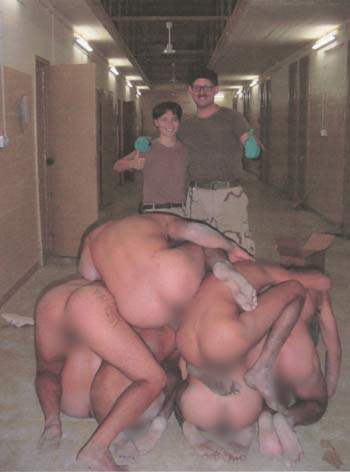
Iraqi male prisoners forced into homosexual contact with each other's genitals touching other men's bodies in a "human pyramid" pile.

Male prisoners of war may be subject to rape and sexual violence. Sexual violence against male prisoners of the Iraq War gained wide publicity after graphic photos documented such abuses on male Iraqi prisoners by US guards at Abu Ghraib prison, where prisoners were forced to humiliate themselves. American soldiers gang raped a 14-year-old Iraqi girl in the Mahmudiyah rape and killings. US soldiers also sodomized children with women present when the women and children were arrested together and it was recorded on video tape according to Seymour Hersh. An Iraqi girl, 14 years old, was raped multiple times by US guards according to The Guardian and an Iraqi woman called Noor sent a letter from the prison detailing her rape by US military policeman which was verified by US Major General Antonio Taguba in his report. US soldiers forced Iraqi male detainees at Abu Ghraib to engage in homosexual activities with each other and forced their anuses to make contact with each other's penises by piling them up on each other while their legs and hands were shackled and handcuffed. Iraqi female lawyer Amal Kadham Swadi interviewed an Iraqi woman raped by multiple American soldiers, telling her to keep it a secret, saying "We have daughters and husbands. For God's sake don't tell anyone about this." She had stitches on her arm from injuries when she tried to resist the rape and these were seen by Swadi. She was held in Baghdad in November 2003 at the former police compound al-Kharkh which was used as a US military base.

=== 2011 – present Iraqi insurgency ===
The Islamic State of Iraq and the Levant (ISIL) has employed sexual violence against women and men in a manner that has been described as "terrorism". ISIL has utilized sexual violence in order to undermine a sense of security within communities, as well as to raise funds through the sale of captives into sexual slavery. According to The Wall Street Journal, ISIL appeals to apocalyptic beliefs and claims "justification by a Hadith that they interpret as portraying the revival of slavery as a precursor to the end of the world". In late 2014, ISIL released a pamphlet on the treatment of female slaves. The New York Times said in August 2015 that "[t]he systematic rape of women and girls from the Yazidi religious minority has become deeply enmeshed in the organization and the radical theology of the Islamic State in the year since the group announced it was reviving slavery as an institution."

=== 2011 Libyan civil war ===
The chief prosecutor of the International Criminal Court (ICC), Luis Moreno Ocampo, claimed that there is evidence that Gaddafi's troops used rape as a weapon during the Libyan civil war. He also said, "Apparently, he [Gaddafi] decided to punish, using rape," while witnesses confirmed that the Libyan government also purchased a large number of Viagra-like drugs. The Libyan government, on the other hand, does not recognize the ICC's jurisdiction.

=== Afghan Taliban ===
In 2015, Amnesty International reported that the Afghan Taliban had engaged in mass murders and gang rapes of Afghan civilians in Kunduz. Taliban fighters killed and raped the female relatives of police commanders and soldiers. The Taliban also raped and killed midwives who they accused of providing reproductive health services to women in the city. One female human rights activist described the situation:

When the Taliban asserted their control over Kunduz, they claimed to be bringing law and order and Shari'a to the city. But everything they've done has violated both. I don't know who can rescue us from this situation.

=== Rape in contemporary peace operations by UN peacekeepers ===
In contemporary conflict zones, international organizations, particularly the United Nations peacekeepers, have been involved in maintaining peace and stability in the area as well as distribute humanitarian aid to the local population. At present there are 16 Peace Operations directed by the UN Department of Peacekeeping Operations. The peacekeepers are mainly composed of military personnel (but to a less number also the police) sent by governments of various member-states. However, over the course of their involvement in the field, peacekeepers have also been accused and at times found guilty of committing rape and other forms of sexual violence to the local population, in particular to women and children. Among all international staff in the conflict zone, United Nations peacekeepers (handled by the Department of Peacekeeping Operations) have been most frequently identified as the perpetrators of rape.

==== Motivations for rape and sexual abuse by peacekeepers ====
Like traditional military ventures, peacekeepers are deployed in highly unstable areas similar to war zones, where there is absence of the rule of law, disintegration of society and great psychological and economic hardships. Having an image of wealth and authority, peacekeepers can easily exercise power over the local population, which is often abused.

Moreover, as members of their respective country's militaries, peacekeepers also carry with them in the peace operations the "hyper-masculine culture" that encourages sexual exploitation and abuse. The motivations for rape differ from the traditional perpetrators (government and rebel forces) in that rape is not part of a war strategy that contributes to fulfilling the organization's mission, but rather more as means to relieve the perpetrators' sexual urges most often related to the military culture. Apart from putting the victim under the threat of physical violence, perpetrators induce sexual acts from the victim through payment, and granting or denying humanitarian aid.

==== Cases of rape and sexual abuse in peace operations ====
UN peacekeepers' involvement in rape was found as early as 1993 during the Bosnian genocide, where peacekeepers were found to regularly visit a Serb-run brothel in Sarajevo that housed Bosniak and Croat women who were forced to become prostitutes. According to the Outlook, sexual misconduct by Indian soldiers and officers on UN duty in Congo raised disturbing questions. In the early twenty-first century, several UN soldiers in Haiti have been accused and convicted of raping boys as young as 14 years. In one instance, Uruguayan UN soldiers were accused in 2011 of raping a Haitian boy, sparking protests that called for the withdrawal of UN peacekeeping forces. In Congo in 2004, peacekeepers from Uruguay, Morocco, Tunisia, South Africa and Nepal have faced 68 cases of rape, prostitution and pedophilia. The investigation resulted in the jailing of six Nepalese troops. In Sudan, the Egyptian contingent was accused of raping six women when the civilians took shelter at the peacekeepers' headquarters in order to flee from the fighting. Allegations of rape of young women and children have also been launched against UN peacekeepers in South Sudan. In Mali, four UN peacekeepers from Chad were involved in the rape of a woman. Members of the Moroccan contingent faced rape charges during the course of their duties at the UN mission in Ivory Coast.

==== Punitive measures ====
The most common challenge in reprimanding perpetrators is the significant underreporting of the issue mainly due to three reasons. First, the victims do not report or file complaints due to fears of revenge from the offender(s), denial of aid and the social stigma against rape victims in the victims' own community. Second, UN higher officials previously dismissed such allegations as "boys will be boys". Third, fellow peacekeepers are accustomed to the "wall of silence" in the spirit of brotherhood characteristic of military culture but also to protect the reputation of their sending government. As a consequence, whistleblowers are often stigmatised.

However, if there would indeed be reports, the UN instituted the Conduct and Discipline Teams (CDTs) to conduct an investigation referring the allegations for serious offense to the Office of Internal Oversight Services (OIOS). When found guilty, the course of the specific disciplinary action is dependent on the employee status of the offender. UN civilian staff and personnel have functional immunity that can only be waived by the UN Secretary-General. In the case of military personnel, they are subject to the jurisdiction of their respective sending governments. The usual practice for offending soldiers has been to repatriate the personnel and prosecute them in their home country. In several cases, punitive measures are imposed such as demotion or dishonorable dismissal. However, very few among guilty personnel have faced criminal charges in their home countries after repatriation.

=== Myanmar ===
In 2016–2017 and beyond, many Rohingya Muslim women were raped by Burmese soldiers during the Rohingya genocide. Mass rape has been a central weapon of war against the ethnic minorities by the Myanmar military. According to the 2018 report of the UN Secretary-General on conflict-related sexual violence, the mass rape of Rohingya girls and women were not a culmination of individual choices to rape nor an unfortunate by-product of war but a part of the Myanmar military policy strategically carried out to forcibly remove the Rohingya ethnic group.

=== Tigray ===
In the Tigray War of 2020–2022 in the Tigray Region of Ethiopia, there were widespread reports of rape and other sexual abuse. Europe External Programme with Africa (EEPA) described an incident of six young girls raped in Mekelle in which the Ethiopian National Defense Force (ENDF) soldiers justified the rape on the grounds that "[the girls]' father is Dr. Debretsion and [the soldiers father]' is Dr. Abiy. We are not all the same", in reference to the two main political leaders of the conflict, Debretsion Gebremichael, the deposed leader of the Tigray Region, and Abiy Ahmed, the prime minister of Ethiopia. Weyni Abraha from Yikono, a Tigrayan women's rights group, viewed the sexual violence as a deliberate use of rape as a weapon of war, stating "This is being done purposely to break the morale of the people, threaten them and make them give up the fight."

Arguments for sexual violence in the Tigray War constituting a deliberate campaign satisfying the definition of genocide include the well-organised command hierarchy of the ENDF as the largest contributor of armed forces to United Nations peacekeeping operations, the strict command hierarchy of the Eritrean Defence Forces (EDF) as the tool of a totalitarian state, testimonies about soldiers refusing to rape being punished, the systematic continuation of patterns of rape over six to seven months, and similarities with rape during the Bosnian War and during the Rwandan genocide.

== Rape camps ==
A rape camp is a detention facility that is designed for or becomes a place where detainees are systematically and repeatedly raped, under the control and authority of state or non-state, armed or civilian, organisational structures.

=== Late twentieth and early twenty-first centuries ===
==== Bangladesh Genocide ====
During the Bangladesh Liberation War, the Pakistani military used army camps as rape camps as a part of the genocide. The Australian doctor Geoffrey Davis who specialised in abortions described in an interview with Bina D'costa about how the Pakistani military shelled hospitals and schools and segregated sexually matured women who were then taken to the compound made available for the troops.

==== Dirty War ====
In Argentina during the Dirty War, the Escuela Superior de Mecánica de la Armada (ESMA or Higher School of Mechanics of the Navy) was used as a torture center and rape camp. Naval officers and secret police officers routinely raped and tortured female prisoners there.

==== Bosnian War ====
Rape camps set up by the Bosnian Serb and Bosnian Croat authorities have been extensively documented in the Bosnian War.

==== Tigray War ====
Sexual violence in the Tigray War included three known rape camps: a rape camp in Hawzen established by the Ethiopian National Defense Force (ENDF) and with rapists from the ENDF and Eritrean Defence Forces (EDF); an ENDF–EDF rape camp at a construction site during which queueing rapists took turns to hold the baby of the victim; and a third rape camp next to a river.

== Forced prostitution and sexual slavery in war ==
Forced prostitution and sexual slavery are distinct as forms of war rape, as they entail more than the opportunistic rape by soldiers of women captives. Instead, women and girls are forced into sexual slavery, in some cases for prolonged periods. This is defined by the UN as "the status or condition of a person over whom any or all of the powers attaching to the right of ownership are exercised, including sexual access through rape or other forms of sexual violence". War time forced prostitution takes several forms ranging from individual trafficking by armed forces to the institutionalization of the act of rape by military or civil authorities. The term 'forced prostitution' is often used in the press to refer to women and girls displaced by war who are forced to engage in prostitution to survive.

== See also ==
- Gendercide
- Genocidal rape
- Raptio, the historic term for the large-scale abduction of women during wars
- Red Terror (Spain)
- Sexual slavery
- Total war
- Violence against women
- Forced circumcision
