= Hüttner =

Hüttner or Huttner is a surname, and may refer to:

- Csaba Hüttner (born 1971), Hungarian sprint canoer
- Hans Hüttner (1885–1956), Wehrmacht officer
- Jan Lisa Huttner (born 1951), American film critic
- Michael Huttner (born 1969), American attorney
- Peter Hüttner (born 1945), Swedish actor
- Per Hüttner, Swedish artist
