= Eielson =

Eielson may refer to:

- Carl Benjamin Eielson (1897-1929), American aviator
- Jorge Eduardo Eielson (1924-2006), Peruvian poet
- Various facilities named for Carl Benjamin Eielson:
  - Eielson Air Force Base, located near Fairbanks, Alaska
  - Ben Eielson Junior/Senior High School, located at Eielson AFB
  - Carl Ben Eielson Elementary School, located in Grand Forks, North Dakota
