= Red River High School =

School in Grand Forks, North Dakota, United States

Location
- 2211 17th Avenue South; Grand Forks, North Dakota 58201; United States; 47°54′11″N 97°03′33″W

Information
- Type: Public high school
- Established: 1967
- School district: Grand Forks Public Schools
- Superintendent: Terry Brenner
- Principal: Kris Arason
- Faculty: 88
- Teaching staff: 85.00 (FTE)
- Grades: 9–12
- Enrollment: 1,190 (2024–2025)
- Student to teacher ratio: 14.00
- Colors: Red, black, white
- Mascot: The Roughriders
- Newspaper: Rider's Digest
- Yearbook: Red River Epilogue
- Website: redriver.gfschools.org

Red River High School (RRHS) is a public high school in Grand Forks, North Dakota, United States. The school was originally built in 1967 for grades 10-12, and was remodeled in 1995 to accommodate grades 9- 12. It serves approximately 1,137 students and is one of two high schools in the Grand Forks Public Schools system. The athletic teams are known as the Roughriders.

The Red River in the school's name refers to the Red River of the North, which flows on the east side of the city. The name "Roughriders" is a reference to Theodore Roosevelt, who spent part of his life in what became western North Dakota.

Red River High School is home to the Summer Performing Arts Company, a summer educational theatre program for grades K-12.

== History ==
Circa 1992, there was a bond proposal to build more space at Red River High for $13,500,000. Voters chose not to accept the proposal. On September 29, 1992, there was a proposal for an expansion for $12,500,000.

== Academics ==
RRHS offers classes in a range of academic fields. Dual credit and Advanced Placement classes are available in several areas of study.

== Sports ==
- Cross-country (boys' and girls')
- Baseball (boys')
- Basketball (boys' and girls')
- Football (boys')
- Gymnastics (girls')*
- Hockey (boys')
- Hockey (girls')*
- Track and field (boys' and girls')
- Soccer (boys' and girls')
- Swimming (boys' and girls')*
- Softball (girls')
- Golf (boys' and girls')
- Tennis (boys' and girls')
- Volleyball (girls')
- Wrestling (co-ed)
- Cheerleading (co-ed)

*RRHS and Central High School have combined teams in several sporting areas, due to low participation numbers, known as the "Knightriders".

=== State championships ===
Team	Total	Years
State Class 'A' boys' basketball	2	1969, 2012
State Class 'A' girls' basketball	2	1988, 2023
State boys' hockey	20	1974, 1977*, 1987, 1988, 1989, 1990, 1996, 1997, 1998, 2000, 2001, 2005, 2007, 2009, 2011, 2013, 2016, 2020, 2022, 2024
State boys' soccer	2	2002, 2005
State girls' soccer	1	2004
State Class 'A' boys' track and field	2	1983, 1992
State Class 'A' girls' track and field	2	1998, 2000
State Class 'A' boys' cross country	2	1973, 1975
State Class 'A' girls' cross country	2	1973, 1975
State Class 'A' volleyball	8	1992, 1993, 1998, 1999, 2002, 2003, 2009, 2011
State Class 'A' boys' tennis	28	1972*, 1973, 1983, 1986, 1989, 1991, 1992, 1994, 1996, 1998, 1999, 2000, 2001, 2002, 2003, 2004, 2005, 2006, 2007, 2008, 2009, 2010, 2011, 2012, 2013, 2014, 2016, 2022
State Class 'A' girls' tennis	22	1984, 1992, 1993, 1994, 1995, 1996, 1998, 2002, 2003, 2004, 2005, 2006, 2007, 2008, 2009, 2010, 2011, 2012, 2013, 2014, 2015, 2017
State Class 'A' boys' golf	13	1975, 1977, 1981, 1982, 1986, 1990, 1994, 1995, 1996, 2017, 2018, 2019, 2024
State Class 'A' girls' golf	6	1979, 1988, 1990, 1997, 2017, 2024
State Class 'A' gymnastics:	3	2004, 2005, 2006

*Denotes co-championship

== Notable alumni ==
- Donald Barcome Jr. (b. 1958), former American Olympic curler
- Tom Brosseau (b. 1976), American musical storyteller and guitarist
- Jon Godfread (b. 1981/1982), American politician and the World's Tallest Politician
- Joel Harlow (b. 1968), American make-up artist
- Arshad Hasan (b. 1980), former executive director of ProgressNow and Democracy for America
- Lorenzo Serna (b. 1980), co-founder of media collective Unicorn Riot and Director of Tactical Media at NDN Collective.
- Virgil Hill (b. 1964), former American professional boxer
- Nicole Linkletter (b. 1985), American fashion model and the winner of Cycle 5 of America's Next Top Model
- Edward O'Keefe, current CEO of the Theodore Roosevelt Presidential Library Foundation
- Grant Potulny (b. 1980), former American professional ice hockey player
- Jon Lizotte (b. 1994), American professional ice hockey player
- Ryan Potulny (b. 1984), former American professional ice hockey player
- Andy Schneider (b. 1981), former American professional ice hockey player
- Greg Brockman (b. 1987), co-founder and president of OpenAI
