= Arshad Hasan =

American democracy activist (born 1980)

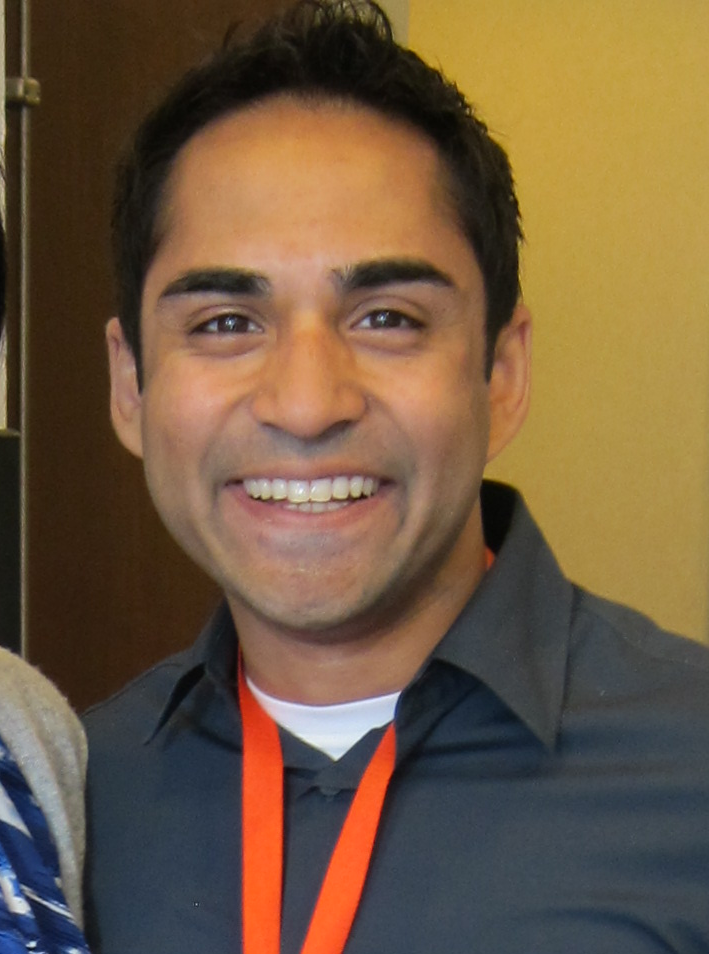
- Hasan at Netroots Nation 2012
- Born: November 18, 1980 (age 45); Grand Forks, North Dakota, USA
- Education: University of Pennsylvania (2003)
- Occupation: Nonprofit executive

Arshad Hasan was the executive director of ProgressNow. He was previously executive director for Democracy for America.

== Education ==
Arshad grew up in Grand Forks, North Dakota, and attended Red River High School.

Arshad attended the University of Pennsylvania, graduating in 2003 with a bachelor's degree in political science. While at Penn, Arshad received the Senior Bowl Man Award, and was part of the Sphinx Honor Society and Oracle Senior Honor Society. While in college, Arshad worked as a paid canvasser and managed teams of paid canvassers on issue campaigns in Minnesota and Pennsylvania. While at Penn, Arshad also wrote for the school’s online newspaper, The Daily Pennsylvanian, and was part of the LGBT community.

== Early political career ==
Arshad traces his involvement with Howard Dean to February 2003, when Arshad founded one of the nation’s first organized pro-Dean groups, Philly for Dean.

From 2003 to 2004, Arshad worked as a statewide organizer for Green Corps on citizen engagement and democracy. Arshad organized statewide environmental issue campaigns on behalf of Clear the Air in Arizona, Bluewater Network in Washington, and Oceana in Florida.

From April to August 2004, Arshad worked as an assistant canvass director for the Fund for Public Interest Research in Rochester, New York.

From August 2004 to November 2004, Arshad worked as an organizer for MoveOn PAC/Grassroots Campaigns, Inc.

== Democracy for America ==
Arshad joined Democracy for America in April 2005. Democracy for America (DFA), is a progressive PAC founded by Howard Dean in 2004. It is headquartered in Burlington, Vermont. Upon joining DFA, Arshad said: "I decided that I wanted to do something that I felt passionate about and I felt passionate about making a difference. We actually deserve better than what we have, so that’s what I work on." In the 2006 general election, Arshad worked as the GOTV Director for Jerry McNerney for Congress.

Arshad started at DFA as a training coordinator and was later promoted to training director. At this position he built DFA’s political training program from scratch, training over 12,000 people online in 43 weekend "boot camps". He remained at this position until October 2007, when his boss unexpectedly left and he was promoted to executive director.

Arshad has been heavily involved with Netroots Nation, a nationwide non-profit that organizes the progressive online community, since 2007. Arshad currently sits on the board of directors.

=== Park51 Islamic Center ===
In late 2010, DFA and Arshad received a large amount of press when the controversy over the Park51 Islamic Community Center in downtown Manhattan started. DFA, usually agreeing with its founder Howard Dean, split with Dean when he stated his opposition to the building. The disagreement between Dean and Arshad turned into a conversation about resolving religious and cultural differences. Arshad and DFA used the disagreement as an opportunity to engage Americans in difficult discussions.

== ProgressNow ==
In November 2013, Arshad was named the executive director of ProgressNow, a national network of state-based progressive advocacy groups. In 2014, Hasan praised then-Vice President Joe Biden for endorsing same-sex marriage in the United States.

== Personal ==
Arshad is gay. He married Abbott Stark in 2013. Arshad and Abbott separated in 2017. Vermont state representative Kesha Ram officiated at the ceremony.
