= Democracy Alliance =

Network of powerful progressive megadonors

- Formation: 2005
- Headquarters: Washington, D.C.
- President: Pamela Shifman
- Website: democracyalliance.org

The Democracy Alliance is a network of progressive megadonors who coordinate their political donations to groups that the Alliance has endorsed. Since its founding in 2005, the Democracy Alliance has given more than $1 billion to liberal organizations and political campaigns. According to The New York Times, the group "channels money from megadonors, whom the group keeps anonymous, to organizations it believes will advance a progressive agenda." It has been described by Politico as "the country's most powerful liberal donor club".

Members of the Democracy Alliance are required to contribute at least $200,000 a year to groups the Democracy Alliance vets and recommends. From its founding in 2005 through 2014, the Alliance helped distribute approximately $500 million to liberal organizations. In 2017 and 2018 alone, Democracy Alliance members increase that sum to $600 million. Prominent members of the group include billionaires George Soros and Tom Steyer.

== History ==
=== 2005-2014 ===
A PowerPoint presentation, "The Conservative Message Machine Money Matrix", created by Rob Stein and shown to individuals and small groups of donors in 2003 and 2004, is often credited as being the impetus for the group's formation.

The first meeting of the Democracy Alliance was held at The Boulders near Scottsdale, Arizona, in April 2005. Rob Stein was appointed interim CEO, pending the group's selection of a permanent leader. George Soros, Peter B. Lewis and Tim Gill were all involved in the organization's founding.

At the Democracy Alliance's second meeting, held at the Chateau Elan near Atlanta, Georgia, in October 2005, management consultant Judy Wade was installed as the CEO of the organization. At the group's fourth meeting in Miami in November 2006, Wade was replaced with Kelly Craighead.

In July 2006, Rob McKay was elected chairman of the board and Anna Burger of the Service Employees International Union (SEIU) was elected vice chair.

In 2012, the Democracy Alliance ceased funding a number of prominent progressive organizations. According to the Huffington Post, "The groups dropped by the Democracy Alliance tend to be those that work outside the [Democratic] party's structure." This move cost the Democracy Alliance the support of Soros ally Peter B. Lewis, the billionaire founder of Progressive Auto Insurance.

According to the Huffington Post, the Democracy Alliance "is largely divided into two camps: one that prefers to focus on electing Democrats to office, and another that argues for more attention to movement and progressive infrastructure building in order to create a power center independent of the Democratic Party apparatus."

=== 2015-present ===
In 2015, the Democracy Alliance announced a new strategy called "2020 Vision".

The strategy is centered on electing more Democrats to state level offices to build its political influence by 2020. The Democracy Alliance planned to raise more than $150 million over five years to assist more than 30 groups, including organizations focused on battles to increase the minimum wage, oppose voter ID laws, address global warming and reduce the influence of money in elections.

As of 2015, the Democracy Alliance, which does not disclose its membership, was reported to have about 110 partners who were required to contribute at least $200,000 a year to groups it vets and recommends. Members included Tom Steyer and some of the U.S.'s biggest labor unions. It has recommended that its donors financially support the Black Lives Matter movement.

In advance of the 2020 elections, the Democracy Alliance retooled its strategy and began to focus on "playing down longtime relationships with groups in Washington and instead preparing to pour $100 million into key states to help defeat President Donald Trump."

Inside Philanthropy described the Democracy Alliance as a "site of frequent coordination between left-leaning funders looking to get out the vote. Its secretive donor base appears to be mobilizing in response to COVID-19, and elections are on the agenda."

In September 2023, it was revealed that the Democracy Alliance was against the No Labels political group's wish to nominate a presidential candidate, in fear that such a candidate may result in Trump's win.

In 2024, the Democracy Alliance planned to spend tens of millions of dollars on elections in California in New York in order to win control of the U.S. House of Representatives for Democrats. According to NBC News, "The nation's largest network of left-leaning megadonors poured millions of dollars into California and New York House races this year to build a get-out-the-vote operation in states so blue that Democrats have not bothered to build much political infrastructure."

In November 2024, The New York Times reported that "the typically sedate biannual meeting of the Democracy Alliance, a network of major liberal donors, became a four-day group therapy session" after the re-election of President Donald Trump.

== Leadership ==
Pamela Shifman is the president of the Democracy Alliance. Prior to Shifman's appointment in October 2021, Gara LaMarche, a longtime progressive activist and close ally of George Soros, held the post. Prior to LaMarche's hiring, Hillary Clinton aide Kelly Craighead led the Alliance. Howard Dean has previously been considered as a potential president for the Democracy Alliance. The board of directors for the Democracy Alliance includes John Stocks, Patricia Bauman, Weston Milliken, Gara LaMarche, Mary Kay Henry, David desJardins, Nick Hanauer, Farhad Ebrahimi, Josh Fryday, Keith Mestrich, Fran Rodgers, Susan Sandler and ex-Clinton administration official Rob Stein. Other members include Drummond Pike; John R. Hunting; Paul Rudd (co-founder of Adaptive Analytics); Pat Stryker; Gail Furman; real estate developer Robert Bowditch; Pioneer Hybrid International-heir and congressional candidate Scott Wallace; Susie Tompkins Buell; real estate developer Albert Dwoskin; and Taco Bell-heir Rob McKay.

== Organizations funded ==
The Alliance recommends a portfolio of progressive organizations that collaborate with each other. In 2014, the Democracy Alliance's "Progressive Infrastructure Map" included 172 organizations, 21 of which were considered core groups. In 2015, the Alliance's funding plans included 35 core organizations. Entities funded by the Democracy Alliance include:

- Advancement Project
- America Votes
- American Constitution Society
- Americans for Financial Reform
- Ballot Initiative Strategy Center
- Black Lives Matter
- Black Civic Engagement Fund
- Brennan Center for Justice
- Catalist
- Center for American Progress
- Center for Community Change
- Center for Popular Democracy
- Center on Budget and Policy Priorities
- Color of Change
- Constitutional Accountability Center
- Demos
- Economic Policy Institute
- Issue One
- Leading Green, a joint venture of the League of Conservation Voters and the Natural Resources Defense Council
- Media Matters for America
- National Employment Law Project
- National People's Action
- New Media Ventures
- Organizing for Action
- PICO National Network
- ProgressNow
- Roosevelt Institute
- State Innovation Exchange
- State Voices
- Wellstone Action
- Working America
- Working Families Party
