= Summer Performing Arts Company =

Educational theater program in North Dakota, USA

The Summer Performing Arts Company (SPA) is a summerstock educational theatre program in Grand Forks, North Dakota that is part of the Grand Forks Public Schools. Started in 1987 as a voice lesson and performance program for high school students, SPA now has over 1000 students ranging from elementary to high school, and produces one to three mainstage productions each summer at the Red River High School Performance Hall and Central High School Auditorium. Other venues have included the Chester Fritz Auditorium at the University of North Dakota and the Empire Arts Center in Downtown Grand Forks. In addition to the mainstage productions, accredited classes for high school students are offered. A middle school/junior high program and elementary school program are also offered. In addition, the Grand Cities Children's Choir operates as a division of SPA. "GCCC" features several separate choirs that have regular concerts and special tours.

The SPA is an eight-week summer arts program available for students in the elementary, middle and high schools in Grand Forks, North Dakota and the surrounding communities. These programs are instructed by staff from the Grand Forks region (including the Grand Forks Public Schools and the University of North Dakota), as well as special guests from around the country.

SPA produces several theatrical performances each year, as well as a series of concerts. Other performance opportunities also exist for students. There are many classes in a variety of areas, including vocal and instrumental ensembles, visual arts, and technology. Individual lessons on voice or an instrument are provided as well. SPA is offered through the Grand Forks Public Schools, and graduation credits are earned by students for their work.

== Elementary SPA ==
Elementary SPA (grades K-5) is a two-week exploratory workshop full of activities such as creative dramatics exercises and theatre games. Students develop characters, create plays, and perform for each other on a daily basis. Also, on the last day there is a student-prepared public performance.

== Middle School SPA ==
Middle School SPA (grades 6-7) is a four-week session focusing on drama, dance, and music. The focus of this program is process rather than product, so emphasis is placed on training. The end performance is a show and tell of what they have learned throughout the session.

== High School SPA ==
High School SPA (grades 8-11) runs for two months, and hours of participation can vary greatly depending on the level of involvement. High school offerings include:

   * Classes, such as vocal ensembles, steel drums, music theory, and jazz dance.
   * Vocal lessons
   * Backstage work on a technical crew
   * On-stage participation in a musical theatre piece

== SPA Mentoring ==
The SPA Mentoring Program is designed to create opportunities for students to develop positive peer and adult relationships. All SPA participants have access to mentoring activities. As part of the program, at-risk students can be referred to the program by a counselor, teacher, or parent, and one-one-one attention is given to these students by trained mentors.

== Quick Facts ==
Approximately 6,537 students have participated in the Elementary SPA program from 1987–2007. These figures, combined with student lesson totals and the Grand Cities Children's Choir, give an approximate number of 11,754 students that have participated in the program from 1987–2007.

In 1988, SPA had 30 participants and 13 staff members. In 2007 there were 1,333 students and 50 staff members.

A student who participates in the SPA program from Kindergarten or first grade until he/she graduates from high school will spend the equivalent of an entire school year with the program.

SPA has given over 325 public performances to over 111,500 audience members.

There have been 904 staff members of the SPA program. Of these 904 staff members, 456 were alumni of the SPA program.

== Keep the Faith ==
The program has gained national recognition for its production of Keep the Faith, a musical written by SPA staff and area composers and musicians after the historic 1997 Red River flood. After attending the 10 year anniversary performance of Keep the Faith, former Federal Emergency Management Agency (FEMA) director James Lee Witt made a suggestion of bringing the musical to the Super Bowl in New Orleans.
