= Gara LaMarche =

American nonprofit executive

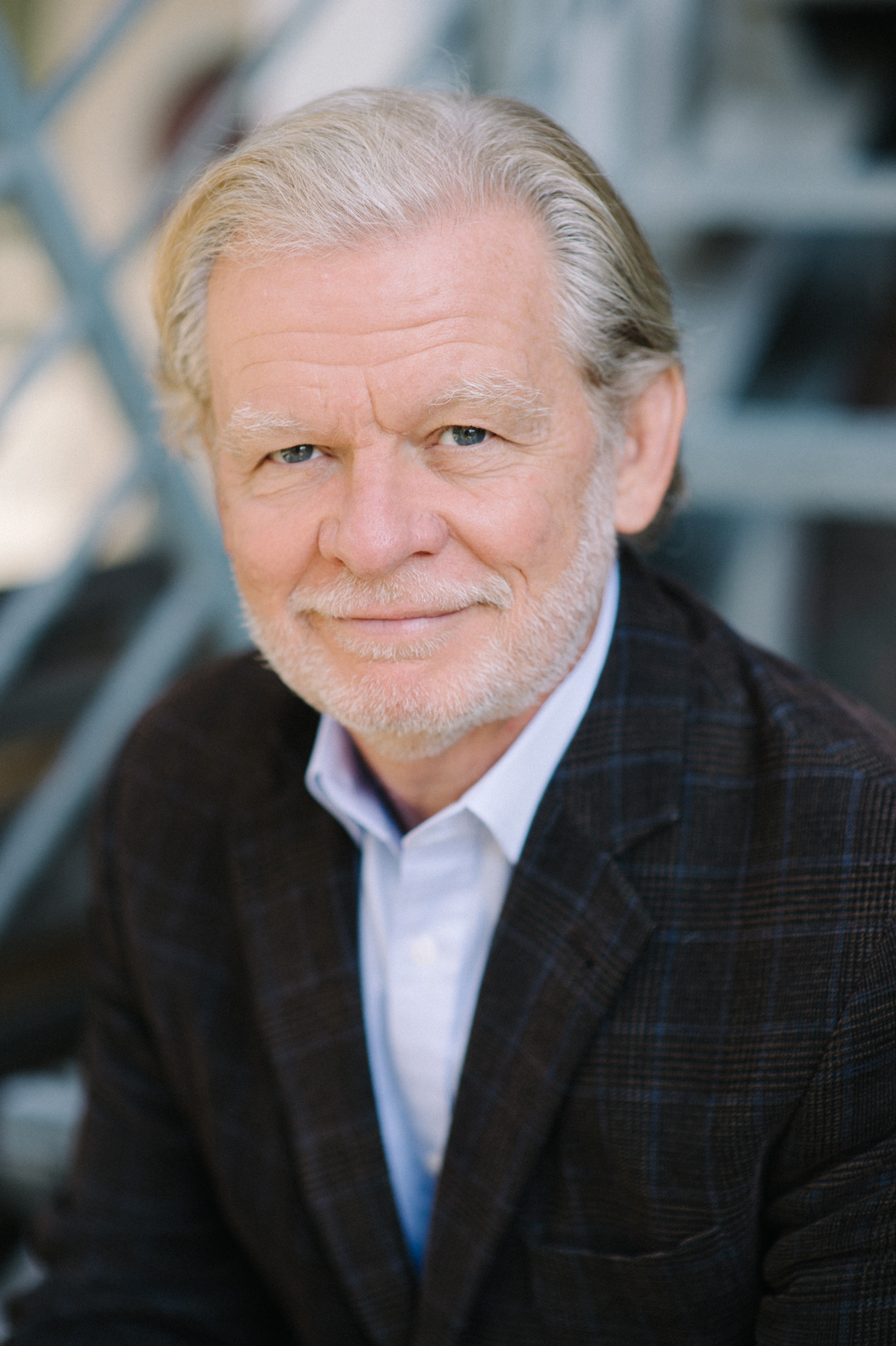
- Born: August 26, 1954 (age 71); Westerly, Rhode Island, U.S.
- Education: Columbia University (BA)

Gara LaMarche (born August 26, 1954) is an American nonprofit executive. He is the previous president and CEO of both The Atlantic Philanthropies and the Democracy Alliance, a network of progressive donors who coordinate their political giving. LaMarche served as vice president and director of U.S. programs for the Open Society Foundations. In his tenure at the Atlantic Philanthropies, LaMarche led the foundation's shift to a social justice approach to grant-making. LaMarche is a Leader in Residence at the Colin Powell School for Civic and Global Leadership of the City College of New York, where he teaches and co-chairs Leadership for Democracy and Social Justice, a City University of New York institute that he co-founded with Deepak Bhargava and Andrew Rich in 2021.

== Background ==
LaMarche was born and raised in Westerly, Rhode Island, and attended St. Bernard's, a small all-boys high school in Uncasville, Connecticut, before enrolling in Columbia College, from which he graduated in 1976. While at Columbia, LaMarche became the youngest member ever to serve on an ACLU policy committee.

== Professional life ==
From 1979-1984, LaMarche was the associate director of the ACLU's New York branch and was the executive director of the ACLU of Texas from 1984 to 1988. From 1988 to 1990, LaMarche was director of the Freedom-to-Write Program of the PEN American Center, when PEN played a leading role in campaigns to lift Iran's fatwa against Salman Rushdie and controversy over arts funding in the United States. From 1990 to 1996, he was director of the Free Expression Project at the Open Society Institute, until he was named the director of U.S. programs.

While at the Atlantic Philanthropies, LaMarche was credited with improving communications and transparency at the foundation. Eventually, however, his disagreements with founder Chuck Feeney about the foundation's activities and visibility caused a "donor-intent crisis", where Feeney's single vote on the board of directors gave him insufficient influence to counter LaMarche's change in the foundation's priorities; by early 2011, an anonymous writer sent the board a letter threatening to take the conflict public and asking, "What will potential philanthropists think if they find out that a foundation board doesn't listen to the wishes of the founder when he is alive and sitting in the room, never mind when he is dead?" The crisis eventually ended with LaMarche's resignation.

=== Affiliations and writing ===
LaMarche is a columnist for HuffPost and The Nation, as well as a blogger in his own right. He has written a number of articles on human rights and is the editor of the 1996 anthology, Speech and Equality: Do We Really Have to Choose? LaMarche has taught at The New York University's Wagner School of Public Service and at the New School University and John Jay College.

LaMarche serves on the boards of the National Committee for Responsive Philanthropy, StoryCorps and The White House Project. He is on the Leadership Council of Hispanics in Philanthropy. He is the winner of the 2010 Hubert H. Humphrey Civil and Human Rights Award from the Leadership Conference on Civil and Human Rights and the Community Change Champion Award from the Center for Community Change.

== Personal life ==
LaMarche has two daughters and lives in New York City.
