= John Stocks (politician) =

American politician and union leader

- Born: New Orleans, Louisiana, U.S.
- Occupation: Former executive director of the National Education Association

John C. Stocks is the former executive director of the National Education Association (NEA). He began his career as a community organizer, political strategist, and state legislator in Idaho before taking roles at the Wisconsin Education Association Council and the NEA. He stepped down from the NEA in 2019. He is the chairman of the board of directors of the Democracy Alliance.

== Career ==
In 1988, Stocks ran for the Idaho Senate, defeating a four-term incumbent. In his one session in the Idaho Legislature, Stocks joined with Republican Sen. Rachel Gilbert to protect people from losing their homes if they are made indigent by medical costs. In 1990, Stocks joined the Wisconsin Education Association Council as assistant director. Early in his career he was also a volunteer firefighter, community organization, and executive director of Idaho Fair Share, a grassroots citizen action organization.

In 2007, Stocks was honored by the Midwest Academy, a grassroots training institute. He was also honored by the Ballot Initiative Strategy Center for his work in ballot measure campaigning.

From 2003 to 2019, Stocks served as an official of the National Education Association.

In 2011, President Barack Obama's campaign manager Jim Messina said, "He's one of the smartest political operatives in the country."

In 2019, Stocks received the Distinguished Alumni Award from The Evergreen State College.

== Personal life ==
A native of New Orleans, Louisiana, Stocks is a graduate of the Evergreen State College. He and his wife, Connie, have two children.
