= Rob Stein =

American political strategist (1943–2022)

Robert Jay Stein (October 26, 1943 – May 2, 2022) was an American political strategist. He launched the Democracy Alliance, which provided seed money to America Votes, Media Matters, and the Center for American Progress. Stein was instrumental in replicating Republican financial strategies in the Democratic Party.
