= Pamela Shifman =

American activist

Pamela Shifman is an American activist, currently the president of the Democracy Alliance, a network of donors that has contributed more than $2 billion to progressive causes and organizations in the United States. Named as one of the 50 Most Powerful Women in Philanthropy in 2023, Shifman is also the founder of Shake The Table, an initiative that is housed at Panorama Global, conducts research and connects social justice movements with philanthropists. She remains affiliated with the organization.

== Career ==
=== NoVo Foundation ===
Shifman joined the NoVo Foundation in 2008, serving as director of initiatives for girls and women. In 2014, she became executive director, overseeing programs focused on advancing the leadership of women and girls of color, ending violence against girls and women and addressing authoritarianism. She held that position until 2019.

During her tenure, the NoVo Foundation launched an $80 million initiative to end violence against girls and women. She also oversaw investments to advance the leadership of Indigenous women and girls and women of color. As executive director, Shifman also led the creation of the Just Beginnings Collaborative to end child sexual abuse and the Collaborative Fund for Women's Safety and Dignity. In 2016, the NoVo Foundation announced a $90 million investment in girls and young women of color in the U.S., calling it the largest commitment ever made by a private foundation to address structural problems facing girls and young women of color in the U.S. Shifman said "it was clear to us from the very beginning that we needed to focus on girls".

=== Shake the Table ===
Shifman founded Shake the Table in 2020 to bring "more and better resources to the work of feminist movements". On a podcast, she said the name was inspired by the idea that "we don't just want a seat at the table, but we want to have a future in which we all have the resources and the power that shapes decisions that impact our lives". In 2022, the organization issued a report calling for an additional $1.5 billion a year to be invested in feminist movements globally, including to organizations in the United States.

=== Democracy Alliance ===
Shifman became president of the Democracy Alliance in September 2021. Announcing her appointment, the alliance's board chair described Shifman as a "forward-thinking strategist who has been ahead of the curve on issues like funding the domestic workers movement and care agenda more than a decade before these efforts were on the national political agenda".

During her tenure, the Democracy Alliance in 2023 began focusing on 2024 U.S. House of Representatives races in New York and California, including $10 million for a coalition of labor and community organizations called Battleground New York. The alliance said these coalitions helped Democrats flip three House seats in California and four in New York, and said it would make additional investments in the coalitions for 2026.

Also under Shifman's leadership, Democracy Alliance began an initiative in 2026 to invest "tens of millions" of dollars in liberal media. Semafor cited a Democracy Alliance strategy memo: "the right has spent decades cultivating and organizing young people. ... We can't cede these voters. It's time for progressives to invest heavily in our own trusted messengers who can meet young people where they are — both online and in-person."

== Opinion articles ==
Shifman has written opinion articles for outlets including The New York Times, The Nation, U.S. News and World Report, CNN and Newsweek, focusing on democracy, girls' and women's rights, racial and economic justice, LGBTQ+ rights and violence against girls and women. In 2024, she wrote in Ms. Magazine that "the struggle for democracy and for gender, racial and economic justice is one fight. It's our fight. Authoritarians are counting on us to miss the connection—but once more of us make it, we will become unstoppable."

== Board memberships ==
Shifman sits on the boards of The Young Women's Freedom Center, the Ms. Foundation for Women and Tools & Tiaras.

== Personal life ==
Shifman was born and raised in suburban Detroit, Michigan and grew up in a family of liberal Jewish activists. A Brooklyn, New York, resident, she holds a bachelor's degree from the University of Michigan and a Juris Doctor degree from the University of Michigan Law School.
