= Grand Forks Public Schools =

School District of Grand Forks, North Dakota, United States

Grand Forks Public Schools (GFPS) is a system of K-12 schools in Grand Forks, North Dakota, United States. GFPS comprises two school districts: the Grand Forks School District and the Grand Forks Air Force Base School District. There are twelve elementary schools, four middle schools, and two high schools. GFPS also operates an alternative high school, an adult learning center, and a Head Start program. GFPS employs 1,100 people and instructs 7,200 students. The current superintendent is Terry Brenner.

== Schools and services ==
=== Elementary schools ===
- Ben Franklin Elementary School
- Century Elementary School
- Discovery Elementary School
- Nelson Kelly Elementary School
- Lake Agassiz Elementary School
- Lewis and Clark Elementary School
- Nathan F. Twining Elementary School (located on Grand Forks AFB)
- Phoenix Elementary School
- Viking Elementary School
- West Elementary School
- Wilder Elementary School
- Winship Elementary School

=== Middle schools ===
- Elroy Schroeder Middle School
- Nathan Twining Middle School (located on Grand Forks AFB)
- South Middle School
- Valley Middle School

=== High schools ===
- Central High School (Knights)
- Red River High School (Rough Riders)
- Community High School (alternative high school)

=== Other services ===
- Adult Learning Center (located in same building as Community High School)
- Head Start (pre-school)
- Summer Performing Arts Company or SPA (an educational summer theater program)
