= Green Corps =

Grassroots environmental organisation

Green Corps Inc.
- Formation: 1992; 34 years ago
- Founders: Leslie Samuelrich, Gina Cummings
- Type: 501(c)(3) nonprofit educational organization
- Exec. Dir.: Renee Wellman
- Budget: $1,668,335
- Website: www.greencorps.org

Green Corps is an environmental organization in the United States that trains recent college graduates in a one-year post-graduate program in grassroots community organizing. During the program, Green Corps organizers learn in the classroom and are deployed in the field to work on campaigns.

== Founding ==
Green Corps was founded in 1992 by Leslie Samuelrich and Gina Cummings with the financial backing of U.S. Public Interest Research Group in response to the momentum created by Earth Day 1990. Green Corps was created to channel young talent into environmental advocacy causes.

== Campaign history ==
Green Corps is hired by non-profits such as the Sierra Club to manage their campaigns in the field. Campaigns Green Corps has worked on include:

- Launching fossil fuel divestment campaigns on campuses.
- Launching a national campaign to label GMO foods.
- Leading the fights to shut coal plants on college campuses.

== Funding ==
In 2014, a donation of $200,000 was given by Green Corps to the Center for Public Interest Research, a 501(c)(3) nonprofit organization.

In 2015, Green Corps paid $240,480 to the Fund for the Public Interest for “program and fundraising support”.

== Leadership ==
=== Executive Directors ===
Executive Directors of Green Corps have included:

- 1992 - 1994 Gina Collins Cummings
- 1994 - 2004 Leslie Samuelrich
- 2004 - 2008 Naomi Roth
- 2008 - 2012 Cindy Kang
- 2012 - 2017 Joshua Buswell-Charkow
- 2017 - 2022 Annie Sanders
- 2022 - present Renee Wellman

=== Board of directors ===
The current Green Corps Board of Directors includes:

- Douglas H. Phelps, President and Executive Director, The Public Interest Network
- Andy MacDonald, National Campus Organizing Director, Student PIRGs
- Leslie Samuelrich, President, Green Century Capital Management
- Wendy Wendlandt, Political Director, The Public Interest Network
- Naomi Roth, NRG Consulting Group
- Bernadette Del Chiaro, Executive Director, California Solar & Storage Association
- Mary Rafferty, Executive Director, Virginia Conservation Network
