= Michael Huttner =

- Born: December 22, 1969 (age 56); Denver, Colorado
- Education: Brown University; San Francisco College of the Law
- Occupations: President of Huttner Group, Inc. Previous CEO of Fenton, Founder of ProgressNow, political consultant, crisis communications expert, attorney, author

Michael Huttner is an American attorney, author, and political activist. Huttner is a partner with Culture of Giving Back, which advises donors on progressive causes, and is the former CEO of Next Titan Capital, an investment bank focused on cannabis and psychedelics. Huttner was also the CEO of Powerplant Global Strategies, a public affairs firm focused on investments in the cannabis industry. In January 2010, he convened a small group of drug reform and policy leaders in Colorado, which laid the groundwork for Colorado to become the first state to decriminalize cannabis in the country. In January 2020, Huttner convened the first meeting to legalize psychedelics statewide in Colorado which culminated with the passage of the Natural Medicine Health Act in November 2022. Previously, Huttner served as the CEO of Fenton. He is the founder of ProgressNow, a network of progressive communication organizations across the United States. To date, Huttner has helped launch over 40 different political and communication organizations.

== ProgressNow ==
Huttner is the founder of ProgressNow, a network of state-based communications organizations that raise awareness and promote progressive solutions through communications and digital media. Huttner started ProgressNow in the back of his law firm with his personal list of 700 email addresses in 2003. Today, the 29 ProgressNow state partners have a combined membership exceeding 3.4 million individuals. Huttner and Bobby Clark, a former staffer to the Howard Dean presidential campaign, worked together in 2005 with the technology provider Blue State Digital to develop the website that launched as ProgressNow. ProgressNow was later adopted by the Barack Obama presidential campaign, 2008. The Washington Post referred to their work as one of the most "ambitious" efforts in grassroots organizing at the state level. Starting with Colorado and then Ohio, Huttner developed a network of state based communications hubs across the country. In 2010, the book "The Blueprint: How Democrats Won Colorado, and Why Republicans Everywhere Should Care" described ProgressNow as the "crown jewel" of the progressive investors' effort to flip the state.

== Author ==
Huttner is the co-author of The Resistance Handbook: 48 Ways to Fight Trump. He also is the author of 50 Ways You Can Help Obama Change America., which the late Senator Edward Kennedy described as "A practical handbook on how every American can do something for our country."

50 Ways was attacked by conservative commentators including Fox News's Neil Cavuto. Conservative author Michelle Malkin also attacked Huttner for reaching out to "[Obama] cultists" and for trying to knock her book Culture of Corruption: Obama and His Team of Tax Cheats, Crooks, and Cronies off The New York Times Best Seller list.

== Reputation ==
Huttner first earned his reputation to hold public officials accountable when he called on every public official in Colorado who supported Congresswoman Marilyn Musgrave's proposed Federal Marriage Amendment to sign a "fidelity pledge."

A noted initiative involved accountability work against top elected officials through a billboard near the Colorado State Capitol that accused Governor Bill Owens of Colorado's post-September 11 attacks economic downturn.

Huttner has been referred to as a communications 'heavyweight' and is known for his creative, hard hitting tactics and snark. Just days before the 2008 Presidential election, Huttner had a plane fly over the Denver Broncos stadium with the banner "McCain is a Raiders Fan." Huttner also gained notoriety around the 1998 Super Bowl where he went without a ticket and then paid a Coca-Cola Vendor $300 for his outfit and then snuck past security to watch the Super Bowl. In early 2022, Huttner initiated the team and strategy for Adam Frisch in his campaign to replace Lauren Boebert and is considered by many to be the biggest upset in the 2022 election cycle.

== Education and professional career ==
Prior to ProgressNow, Huttner was a founding partner in the Denver law firm of Foster, Graham and Huttner (now known as Foster Graham Milstein and Calisher, LLP) where he provided legal counsel on political, nonprofit and lobbying practice. Prior to his private practice, Huttner worked as Policy Advisor to Governor Roy Romer and before returning to Colorado, his home, he clerked at the White House for the Office of the Counsel to the President.

Huttner grew up in Denver, Colorado and graduated from Cherry Creek High School, earned his B.A. from Brown University and his J.D. from the UC Hastings College of Law. He has taught as an adjunct professor at the University of Denver College of Law.
