= ProgressNow =

U.S. progressive advocacy group

- Formation: 2003; 23 years ago
- Founder: Michael Huttner
- Type: Advocacy group
- Legal status: 501(c)(4)
- Purpose: Progressive advocacy
- President: Anna Scholl
- Website: www.progressnow.org
- Formerly called: Rocky Mountain Progressive Network

ProgressNow, previously the Rocky Mountain Progressive Network, is a progressive 501(c)(4) advocacy organization in the United States. Founded in 2003, ProgressNow bills itself as a network of state based communications hubs which act as a marketing department for progressive ideas.

== History and mission ==
ProgressNow was created in 2003 as a response to the libertarian Independence Institute. It has since grown a subscriber base of more than 350,000 grassroots activists in Colorado as of 2012. In 2006, ProgressNow began to expand its network outside of Colorado and has since created ProgressNow Partners Networks in 26 states.

The first chairman was Rollie Heath, a Boulder executive who gained office as the 18th district's state senator in 2008. Heath was followed by Dr. Albert Yates, the former president of Colorado State University. The founder of ProgressNow is Michael Huttner, a Brown University and University of California Hastings College of Law graduate and lawyer turned political strategist. The current executive director is Arshad Hasan, who previously led Democracy for America.

Its founding board members included Wes Boyd, founder of MoveOn.org, Rob McKay, chairman of the board of the Democracy Alliance and president of the McKay Family Foundation, Jared Polis, elected in 2008 as the U.S. Congressman for Colorado’s 2nd District, and Ted Trimpa (the current chair), an attorney and government relations expert.

The group co-sponsored a blogging workspace, 'The Big Tent', during the 2008 Democratic National Convention. In 2007, progressnow.org received multiple honors from the Golden Dot Awards (online political advocacy awards).

In 2010, the book The Blueprint: How Democrats Won Colorado, and Why Republicans Everywhere Should Care by Adam Schrager and Rob Witwer described ProgressNow as the "crown jewel" of the progressive investors' effort to flip the state.

== Affordable Care Act advocacy ==
In October 2013, ProgressNow Colorado released a controversial series of advertisements promoting Obamacare. According to the Denver Post, one advertisement "features a woman flashing a thumbs up with one hand and holding a packet of birth-control pills in the other. She is wrapped in a man's arm next to text that includes the sentence 'Let's hope he's as easy to get as this birth control.'" In response to inquiries about whether taxpayer funding was used for the advertising campaign, Amy Runyon-Harms, the executive director of ProgressNow Colorado said, "I know some people are saying this is a taxpayer-funded campaign...but that is just not the case." ProgressNow said the series of advertisements was paid for with donations and individual contributions, and the organization denied association with state agencies.

== Cardboard Cory ==
ProgressNow Colorado was notably a part of a four year campaign to oppose Republican U.S. Senator Cory Gardner. A group of activists and ProgressNow came up with the concept of a cardboard cutout of Gardner, and developed and participated in events, press conferences, and rallies with the stand-in from 2017 until Gardner's defeat in 2020.

== State affiliates ==
ProgressNow has state partner organizations in 26 states.

State	Organization	Year Founded
Alaska	The 907 Initiative	2022
Arkansas	For AR People	2020
California	Courage California	2007
Colorado	ProgressNow Colorado	2003
Florida	Progress Florida	2008
Georgia	Progress Georgia	2020
Indiana	Stand Up Indiana	2023
Iowa	Progress Iowa	2012
Kansas	Kansas Coalition for Common Sense	2022
Maryland	Advance Maryland	2018
Michigan	Progress Michigan	2007
Minnesota	Alliance for a Better Minnesota	2006
Missouri	Progress Missouri	2022
Montana	Middle Fork Strategies	2022
Nevada	Battle Born Progress	2009
New Hampshire	Granite State Progress	2014
New Mexico	ProgressNow New Mexico	2011
North Carolina	Progress North Carolina	2011
North Dakota	Prairie Action ND	2019
Ohio	Innovation Ohio	2011
Pennsylvania	Commonwealth Communications	2020
Tennessee	Forward TN	2017
Utah	Alliance for a Better Utah	2011
Virginia	Progress Virginia	2011
Washington	Fuse Washington	2007
Wisconsin	A Better Wisconsin Together	2019

== See also ==
- Democracy Alliance
- MoveOn.org
