= Striker =

Striker or The Strikers may refer to:

== People ==
- A participant in a strike action
- A participant in a hunger strike
- Blacksmith's striker, a type of blacksmith's assistant
- Striker's Independent Society, the oldest mystic krewe in America

=== People with surname Striker ===
- Eric Striker (born 1993), American football linebacker for the Oklahoma Sooners
- Fran Striker (1903–1962), American writer for radio and comics
- Gideon Striker (c.1825–1886), Canadian businessman and politician
- Gisela Striker (born 1943), German classical scholar, specialist in ancient Greek and Roman philosophy
- Jake Striker (1933–2013), American baseball player
- Joseph Striker (1898–1974), American actor
- Matt Striker (Matthew Kaye, born 1974), American professional wrestler and wrestling commentator
- Rob Striker (born 1965), American microbiologist and infectious diseases physician
- "Mighty Striker", Trinidadian calypsonian Percival Oblington (1930–2011), also known simply as "Striker"
- "Striker" (gamer), South Korean professional video-game player Kwon Nam-joo (born 1999/2000)

== Arts and entertainment ==
=== Film ===
- Striker (2010 film), a 2010 Hindi film
- Striker (1988 film), a 1987 Italian war-action film

=== Print ===
- Striker (comic), a comic strip in the British tabloid The Sun
- The Striker (Cussler novel), a 2013 novel in the Isaac Bell series, by Clive Cussler and Justin Scott
- The Striker (Huang novel), a 2024 sports romance novel by Ana Huang
- Striker, a 2025 novel by Helene Hegemann
- The Striker, a 2005 novel by Deborah Abela

=== Music ===
- The Strikers (funk band)
- The Strikers (psychobilly band)
- Striker (band)

=== Gaming ===
- Strikers, initial North American release name for the Spriggan manga series
- Striker (video game), a 1992 football video game for numerous systems
- Striker (miniatures game), a 1981 wargame in the Traveller Universe
- Striker, a type of character in The King of Fighters video game series
- Mario Strikers, a series of soccer video games with Mario franchise characters
  - Super Mario Strikers, the first game in the series
- Striker, a sub-class of the Titan character class in the Destiny franchise

=== Fictional characters ===
- Striker (Marvel Comics)
- Striker, a character in Helluva Boss
- Striker, a fictional villain in the 2013 Indian film Krrish 3
- Ted Striker, a character in the films Airplane! and Airplane II: The Sequel
- Striker Eureka, a Jaegar from the 2013 Sci-Fi mecha monster film Pacific Rim

== Sports ==
- Striker (association football), a position in association football
- Striker (field hockey), a position in field hockey
- Striker (FIFA World Cup mascot) (1994)
- American soccer teams called the Fort Lauderdale Strikers:
  - The current Fort Lauderdale Strikers (2006–2016) who play in the North American Soccer League
  - Fort Lauderdale Strikers (1977–1983) played in the NASL from 1977 to 1983
    - The Minnesota Strikers played in the NASL and MISL from 1984 to 1988 and were a continuation of the original Fort Lauderdale Strikers
  - Fort Lauderdale Strikers (1988–1994) played in the ASL and APSL from 1988 to 1994
- Richmond Strikers, an unrelated soccer club in Richmond, Virginia
- The active batsman in cricket
- Striker, a term used in mixed martial arts to refer to a fighter that is especially skilled in stand-up fighting
- PCB Strikers, a Pakistani women's cricket team

== Weapons ==
- FV102 Striker, a British Army anti-tank guided missile carrier
- Armsel Striker, a revolver action shotgun
- A form of firing pin, part of the firing mechanism of a firearm
- The Mk 47 Striker, an automatic grenade launcher

== Military ==
- Camp Striker, a logistical and life support bases on Victory Base Complex, Iraq
- HMS Striker, the name of three ships of the Royal Navy
- A helmet-mounted display, in service on the Eurofighter Typhoon
- A member of the U.S. Navy or Coast Guard working toward a specific rating; see List of United States Navy enlisted rates

== Dogs ==
- Skriker or Striker, legendary Black dog from Lancashire
- Striker (FIFA World Cup mascot), mascot of the 1994 FIFA World Cup
- Striker, Border Collie, holder of the world record for opening a car window, see Border Collie#Notable Border Collies
- Striker, Labrador Retriever, killed during the Ruby Ridge standoff
- Vanderbilt 'N Printemp's Lucky Strike, male Samoyed, multiple winner of the Westminster Kennel Club Dog Show's Working Group

== Other ==
- Oshkosh Striker, a make of fire truck
- Dolphin striker, a spar aboard a sailing ship
- Raw Striker, a kit car manufacturer
  - Sylva Striker, a Sylva Autokits car model later acquired by Raw Striker
- Fire striker, a piece of iron or steel used to generate sparks by striking it against a hard material such as flint

== See also ==
- Stryker (disambiguation)
- Strike (disambiguation)
- Straker, a surname
