= Stryker (disambiguation) =

The IAV Stryker family is a series of eight-wheeled all-wheel-drive armored combat vehicles.

Stryker may also refer to:

== People ==
- Stryker (DJ) (born 1971 as Gary Ramón Sandorf), American radio personality; also known as Theodore Ramón Stryker

=== People with the surname ===
- Harold Stryker (1915–2005), American politician from Nebraska
- Homer Stryker (1894–1980), American orthopedic surgeon, and founder of Stryker Corporation
- Jeff Stryker (born 1962), American porn star
- Jon Stryker (born c. 1958), American architect, philanthropist and activist
- Kitty Stryker (born 1984), American sex educator and activist
- Matt Stryker (born 1979), ring name of wrestler Brian Woermann
- M. Woolsey Stryker (1851–1929), American clergyman
- Michael Stryker (born 1947), American neuroscientist
- Robert F. Stryker (1944–1967), Medal of Honor, Vietnam War
- Ronda Stryker (born 1954), American billionaire heiress
- Roy Stryker, (1893–1975) managed documentary photography projects during the Great Depression for the U.S. government
- S. Kellogg Stryker (1902–1989), curator of The Philatelic Foundation (1962-1976)
- Stuart S. Stryker (died 1945), received the Medal of Honor for his actions during World War II
- Susan Stryker (born 1961), American professor, author, filmmaker, and theorist of gender and sexuality
- Stryker (DJ) (Theodore Ramón Stryker) (born 1971), American disc jockey
- Tim Stryker (1954–1996), founder Galacticomm, makers of MajorBBS

==== Fictional characters ====
- Buddy Lee Striker, a fictional private investigator, the eponymous lead character in the telemovie series B.L. Stryker
- John Stryker, a character from the Stryker's Run and Codename: Droid video games
- Kurtis Stryker, a character from the Mortal Kombat fighting game series
- William Stryker, a Marvel comics villain, father of Jason Stryker
- Jason Stryker, a Marvel comics villain, son of William Stryker
- Ted Stryker, a character in the film Zero Hour!
- Willis Stryker (Marvel Cinematic Universe)
- Inspector Stryker, a fictional police officer, the eponymous lead character from the 1953 film Stryker of the Yard

=== People with the given name ===
- Stryker McGuire, an American journalist
- Stryker Sulak (born 1986), U.S. American football player
- Stryker Trahan (born 1994), American baseball player
- Stryker Zablocki (born 2007), Canadian ice hockey player

== Places ==
- Stryker, Montana, USA; an unincorporated community in Lincoln County
- Stryker, Ohio, USA; a village in Williams County
  - Stryker High School, Stryker, Ohio
  - Stryker Local School District, Williams County, Ohio
- Homer Stryker Field, Kalamazoo, Michigan, USA; a baseball stadium
- Livingood House-Stryker Hospital, Reading, Berks County, Pennsylvania, USA

=== Fictional locations ===
- Stryker's Island, a fictional island in DC Comics containing a fictional prison by the same name

== Groups, organizations ==
- Stryker Corporation, a manufacturer of medical and orthopedic products.
- Biib Strykers, Palau; a soccer team
- Empire Strykers, Ontario, California, USA; an indoor soccer team located in the Inland Empire
- Pune Strykers, Pune, Maharashtra, India; a field hockey team
- Woodlands Strykers, The Woodlands, Texas, USA; a baseball team
- Bank of Guam Strykers FC, Guam; a soccer team

== Other ==
- Mk 47 Striker 40mm automatic grenade launcher
- Stryker (Farscape), a fictional spacecraft in Farscape
- Stryker (1983 film), a Filipino film
- Stryker (2004 film), a Canadian film

== See also ==
- Strykers Bowl, Tamworth, Staffordshire, England, UK; an entertainment centre
- Stryker's reagent ([(PPh_{3})CuH]_{6}), or, Osborn complex
- Stryker's Run, a video game published in 1986.
- Striker (disambiguation)
- Strike (disambiguation)
