= New Zealand Railways Road Services =

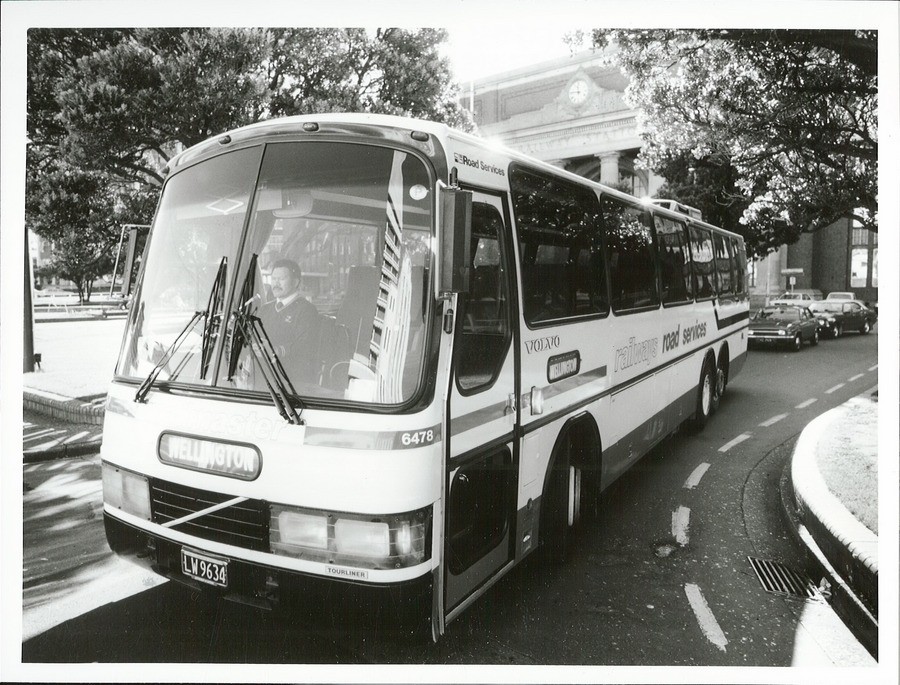
- Road Services coach leaving the Wellington Railway Station
- Formerly: New Zealand Railways Road Motor Service
- Founded: 1926; 100 years ago
- Defunct: 1991; 35 years ago
- Fate: Restructured & privatised
- Successors: InterCity; Cityline; Speedlink Parcels
- Headquarters: Wellington, New Zealand
- Area served: New Zealand-wide
- Parent: New Zealand Railways Department

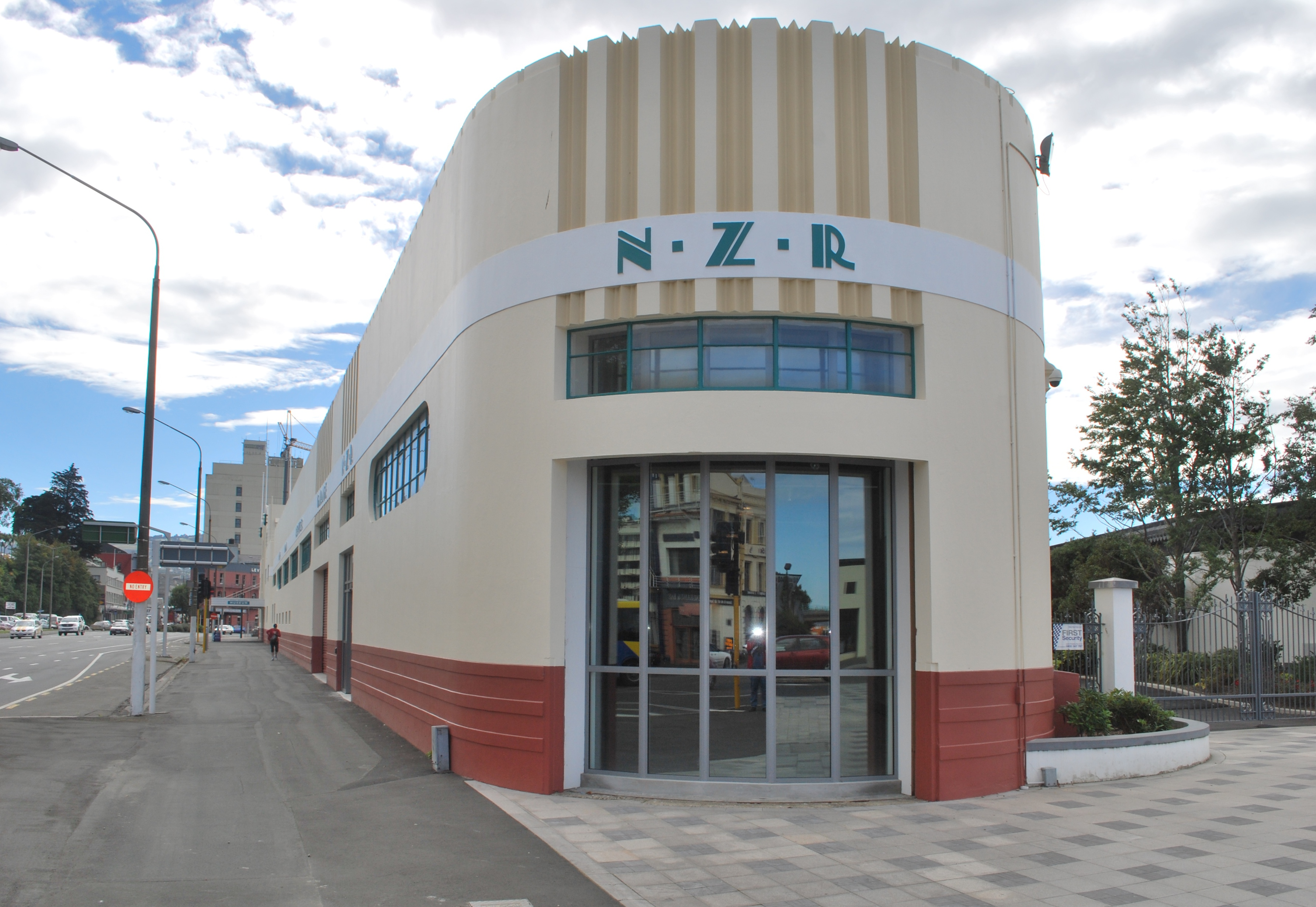
New Zealand Railways Road Services depot in Dunedin

The New Zealand Railways Road Services (NZRRS) was a branch of the New Zealand Railways Department and later the New Zealand Railways Corporation. It operated long-distance, tourist and suburban bus services and freight trucking and parcel services. Its name was New Zealand Railways Road Motor Service until mid-1936.

== History ==
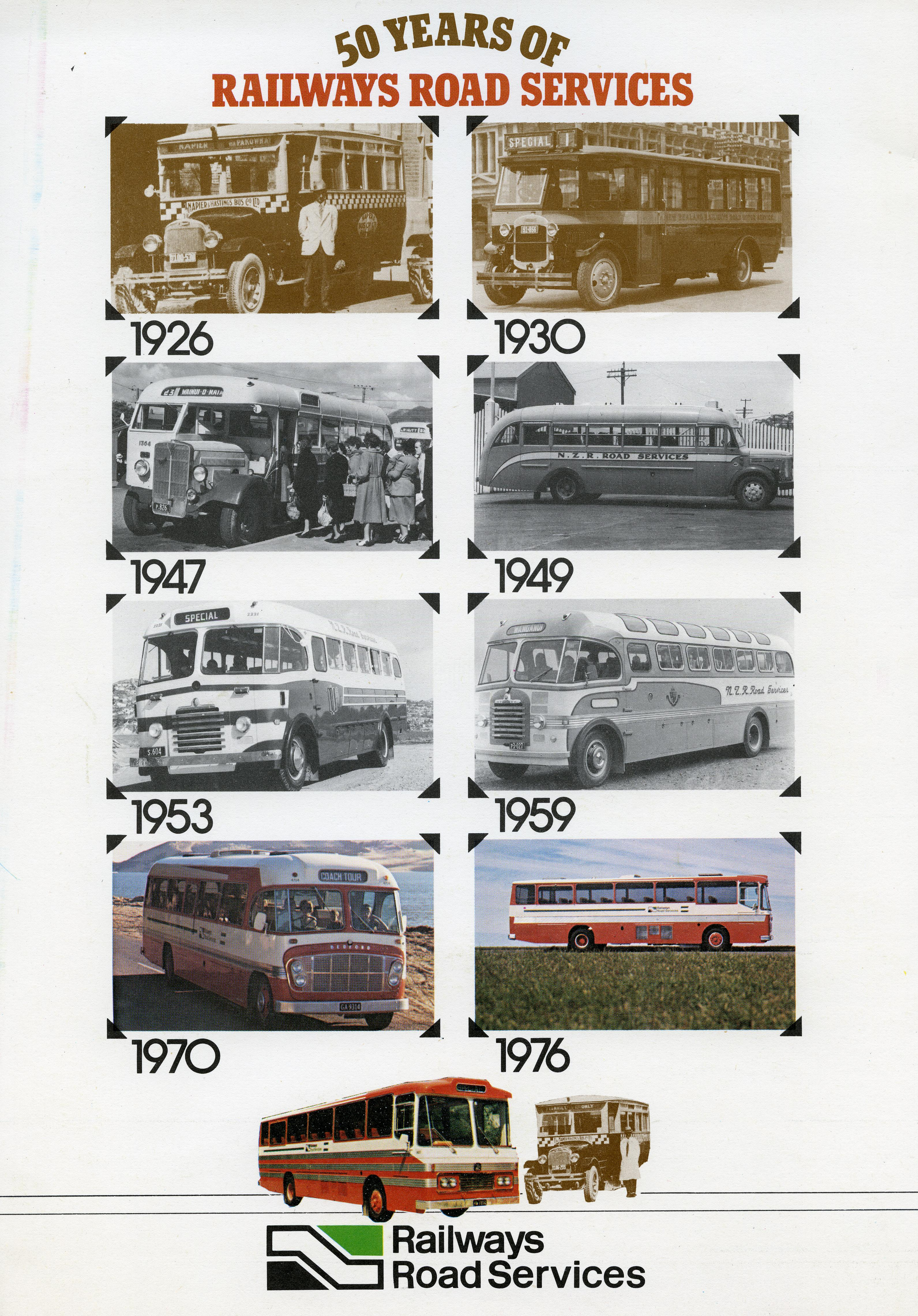
Back cover of a commemorative publication about Railway Road Services in New Zealand published 1976, showing the buses used from 1926 to 1976.

The first bus operation by NZR began on 1 October 1907, between Culverden on the Waiau Branch and Waiau Ferry in Canterbury. By the 1920s NZR was noticing a considerable downturn in rail passenger traffic on many lines due to increasing ownership of private cars, and from 1923 it began to coordinate rail passenger services with private bus services.

In November 1926, NZR purchased a private bus firm operating between Hastings and Napier in the Hawke's Bay region. NZR then acquired various other bus services in Dunedin and the Hutt Valley, and by 1928 was operating 56 buses. In 1931 Parliament passed the Transport Licensing Act, which regulated local bus services to ensure that services would not compete with NZR. This further increased acquisitions by NZR of small bus companies.

By 1954 the bus routes covered 6,000 miles (9,700 km), but generally at higher fares than the railways. For example, the 230 miles (370 km) Christchurch-Dunedin return journey cost £2 13s 6d by rail, but £3 10s by bus and took 7hr 10min on the fastest train, but 9hr by bus.

By the 1970s, NZRRS offered a nationwide service. Some routes were direct train replacements, but others extended the reach of the railways to other towns and destinations, including:

- Auckland - Bay of Islands - Kaitaia
- Auckland - Paeora - Tauranga
- Auckland - Rotorua - Whakatane - Gisborne
- Auckland - Wairakei - Wellington
- Rotorua - Taihape - Wellington
- Wellington - Wanganui - New Plymouth
- Wellington - Masterton
- Christchurch - Hokitika - Wanaka - Queenstown
- Christchurch - Timaru - Dunedin - Invercargill
- Dunedin - Milford - Te Anau
- Dunedin - Alexandra - Queenstown

In addition, there were many other local and urban services across the country.

There was a certain amount of rivalry within NZR between NZRRS and the rail Traffic Branch and in many ways they competed with rather than complement each other. For example, many cities had bus terminals some distance from railway stations and many NZRRS routes ran parallel to and at similar times to trains. This animosity lasted almost to the end, with complaints as late as 1984 that buses should not be competing with trains.

== Fleet ==
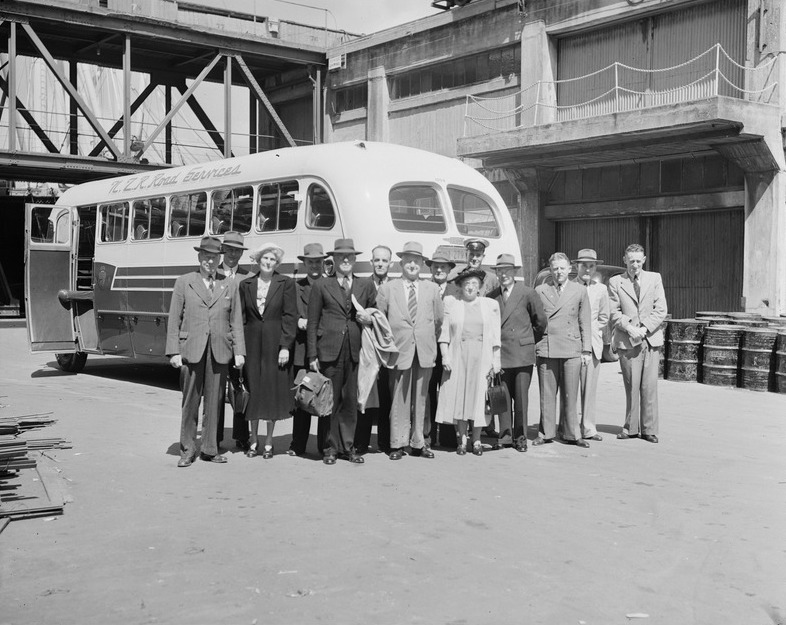
Australian and New Zealand Railways Commissioners, Auckland, February 17, 1951

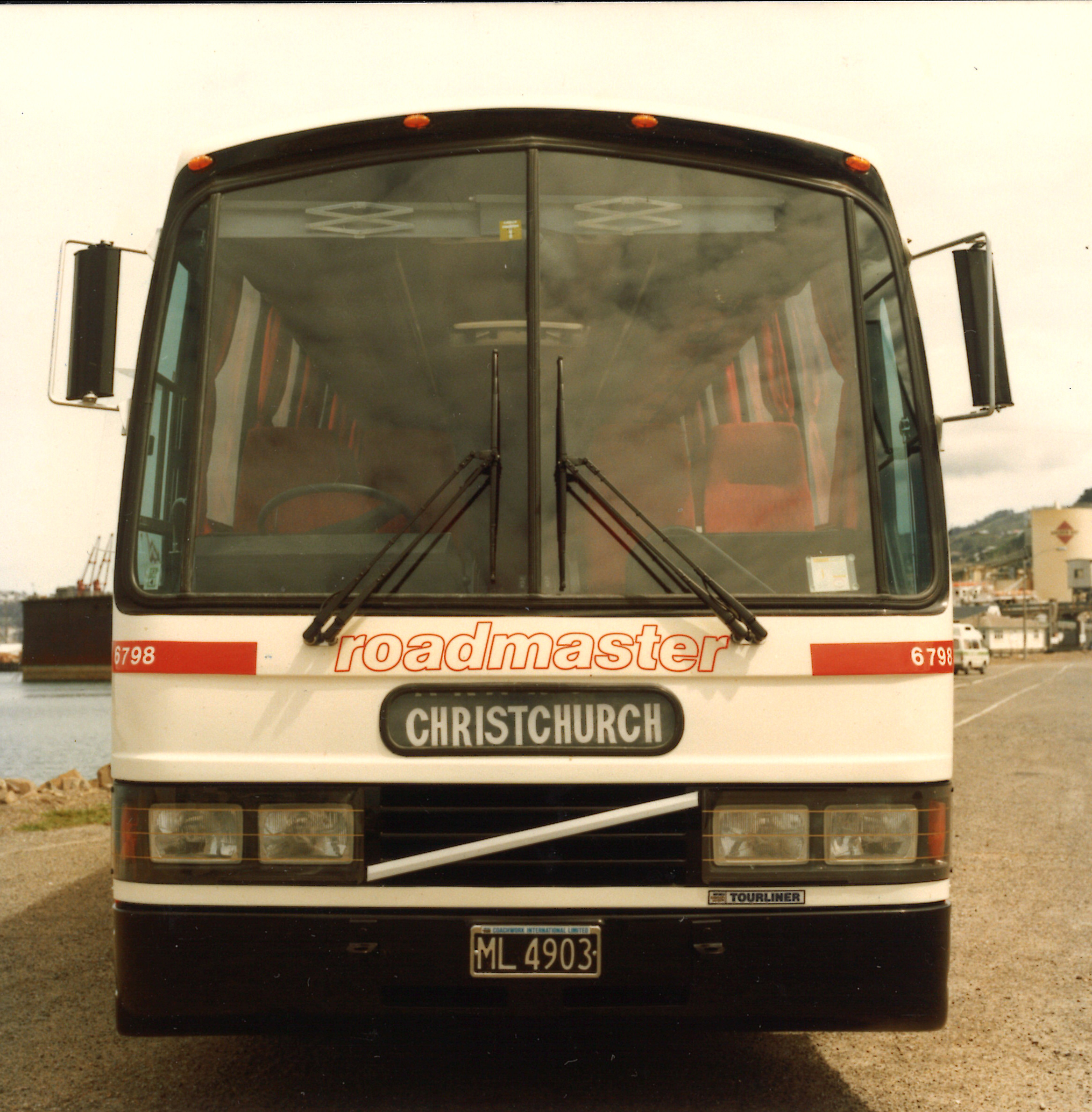
Volvo Roadmaster Road Services - Coaches c1985

Early years of the Road Services saw many different brands of buses acquired with the various constituent companies. From Ford Model T-based cars to Straker steam trucks, to various Albion, Cadillac, Dodge and Leyland buses. The builders of the bodies were many and various.

Leading up to World War II, standardisation was the call. During the 1940s Ford V8 and Bedford truck chassis with New Zealand Motor Bodies (NZMB) became the standard NZRRS bus.

In 1950 a 24-seat, forward-control Commer was introduced on the Gisborne-Auckland route. During the 1950s NZRRS began to widely use the Bedford SB chassis fitted with NZMB bodies. So much so, that the Bedford SB was ordered right up until 1980. NZRRS eventually bought 1,240 of these chassis, which were used in suburban, local rural, and long-distance service. This was the largest fleet of Bedford SB buses in the world.

During the late 1970s NZRRS, like many other operators, was having issues with the general reliability of their fleet. Orders were made to Volvo and Hino in an effort to find a better vehicle. Hino and Volvo buses and coaches were purchased right up until the end of the NZRRS.

== Restructuring ==
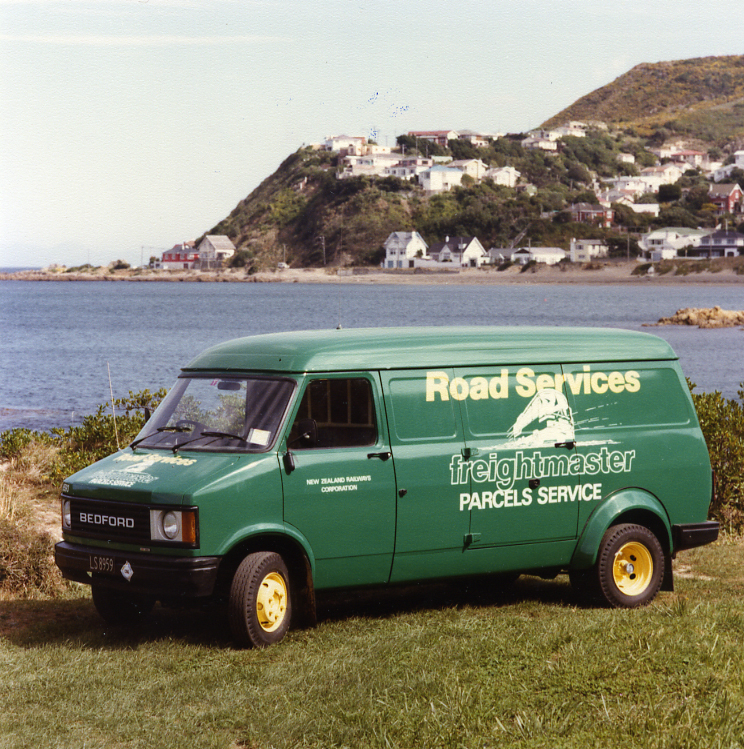
Road Services - Freightmaster Parcels Van, Wellington c1985

In 1985 the land operations of NZRC was restructured into market-based bi-modal (road and rail) business groups, rather than branches based on mode of transport,. As part of the new Passenger Business Group, NZRRS was progressively rebranded:

- Speedlink - rebranding the former railways parcels service, introduced in 1985.
- InterCity - long-haul passenger services (road and rail), introduced in 1987.
- Cityline - urban passenger services (road and rail), introduced in 1988.

The freight trucking business was split off and combined with rail freight into the Freight Business Group, branded Railfreight Systems.

== Privatisation ==
Road and rail services were separated in 1991 when the rail and ferry operations of New Zealand Railways Corporation were transferred to New Zealand Rail Limited and the road transport operations were sold:

- InterCity buses was sold in 1991 to InterCity Management Limited, a group of seven of the largest private coach companies (Whangarei Bus Company, Bayline Group, Ritchies Transport, Tranzit Group, Pacific Tourways, Guthreys Coachlines, Nelson SBL).
- Cityline services were sold to a range of companies, including:
  - Auckland & Wellington services were sold to Wellington City Transport, subsequently becoming Stagecoach
  - Dunedin services were sold to Newton's Coachways
  - New Plymouth - Waitara taken over by Withatruck Coachlines
- Speedlink Parcels was sold to New Zealand Post.

The road freight operation stayed with the railways, eventually becoming part of Tranz Link in 1995.
