= Sylva Autokits =

English kit car manufacturer

- Industry: car manufacturer
- Founded: 1981
- Founder: Jeremy Phillips
- Headquarters: Lincolnshire, England
- Products: Sylva Star; Sylva Leader; Sylva Striker; Sylva Fury; Sylva J15; Fisher Fury; Stylus Classic; Stylus RT

Sylva Autokits is a kit car manufacturer based in Lincolnshire, England. Sylva was founded in 1981 by Jeremy Phillips and has developed and produced a number of small and lightweight sports cars. Sylva cars have won a number of 750 Motor Club Kit Car championships.

Sylva has sold many of its older designs to other kit car manufacturers, such as selling the Fury to Fisher Sportscars, the Stylus to Specialist Sports Cars, and the Striker to Raw. By doing so, Sylva has been able to focus on newer designs such as the current Sylva Mojo 2 and R1ot.

In 2016, founder Jeremy Phillips retired and sold the company to David MacBean, who renamed it to Sylva Sportscars.

== Models ==
=== Star ===
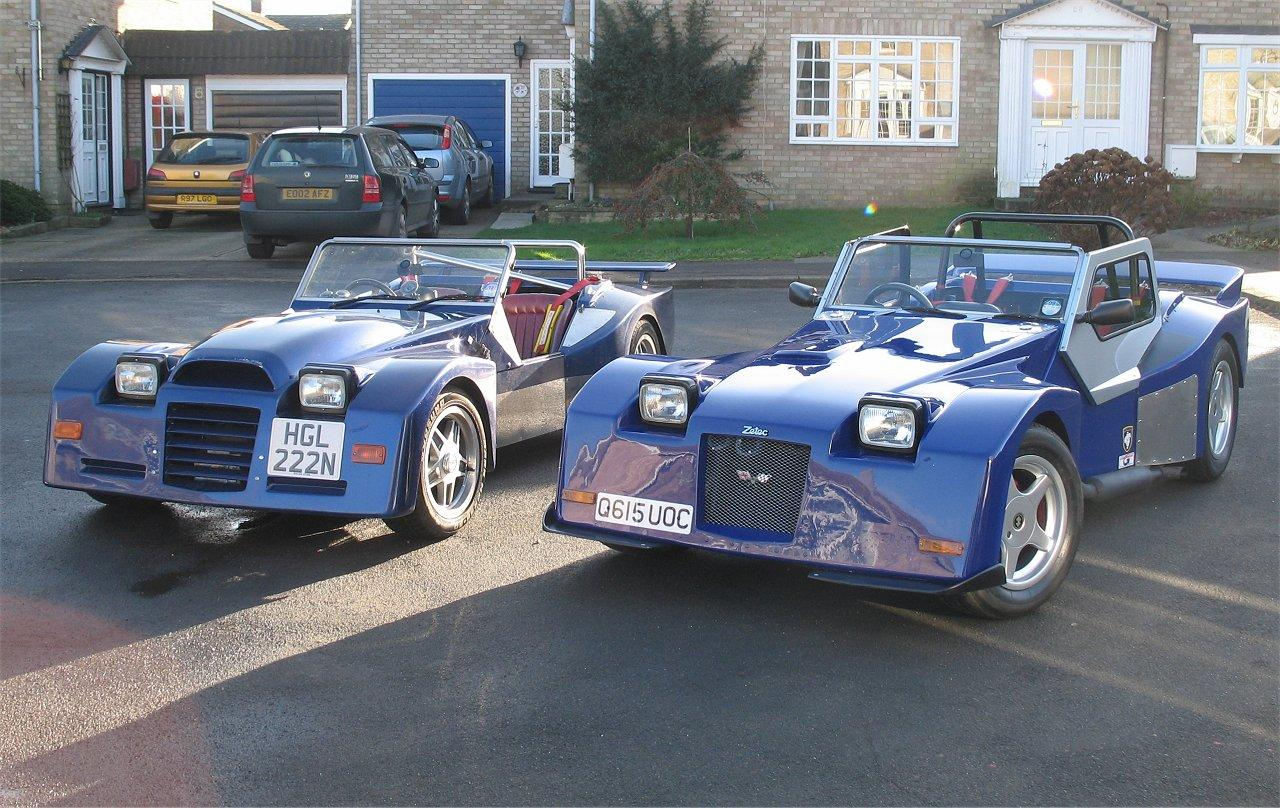
Two Sylva Stars, one with Fiat 2L Twincam the other Ford Zetec

The first Sylva car launched in 1982. The Sylva Star kit was based on a purpose-built two-seater chassis using the front subframe and the rear axle from a donor Vauxhall Viva. The car was most often powered by 1300 and 1600 four-cylinder Ford Kent crossflow engines, though other engine options were available. The Sylva Star was the first in a long line of small, agile two-seater open-top cars produced by Sylva.

=== Leader ===
The Sylva Leader was an evolution of the Sylva Star retaining the two-seater, open-top, layout but with improved design features. The two-piece fiberglass body consisted of a front hinging bonnet (hood) and low-sided passenger compartment. Engine options were Ford Kent Crossflow and Fiat Twin cam engines. Some Sylva Star owners replaced the front with the narrower and more curved Leader front body piece.

The manufacturing rights for the Leader were first sold to Nials Johannson, who continued to make the kits under the name Swindon Sportscars.

=== Striker ===
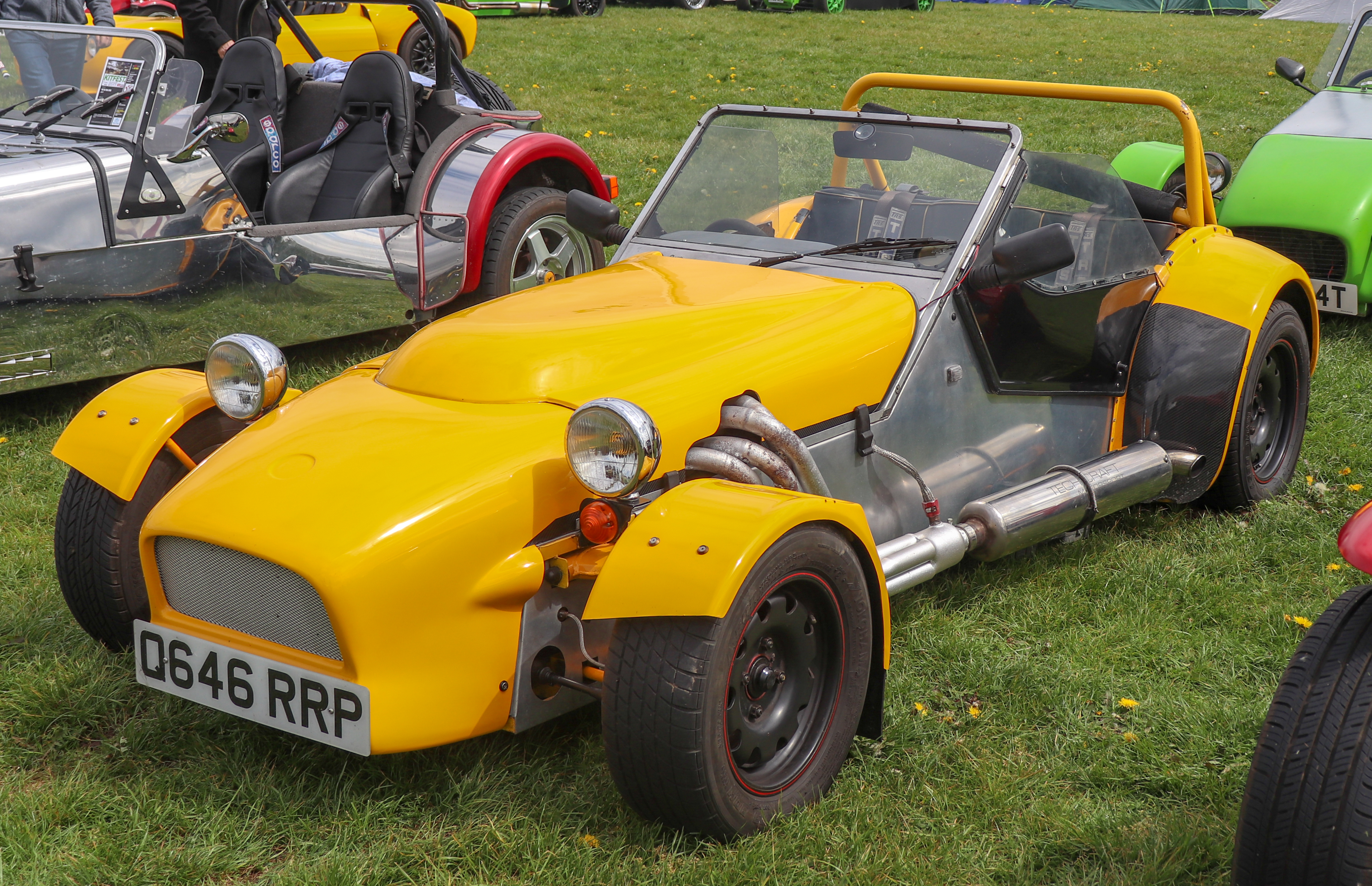
Sylva Striker

The most enduring of the Sylva models, the Striker was a radical evolution of the Star and Leader dropping the Viva donor car in favour of purpose built suspension and lighter bodywork.

=== Phoenix ===
The Phoenix was a built for race version also known as the mk4 Striker. The core chassis was similar but the fiberglass bodywork was developed for race purposes with a curved and lowered front and wheel covering outer edges. Used extensively in the kitcar race series, the design was sold by Sylva to Stuart Taylor Motorsport who have since sold it on again. It has recently found a new home with Raw Engineering who also own the rights to the Striker.

=== Fury ===
The Sylva Fury was launched in 1991 and had an original, 1960s-inspired design, reminiscent of a number of British sports cars of that period. The rights to the design were sold to Fisher Sportscars in 1994; the Fury is currently owned by Fury Sportscars who purchased the rights from BGH Geartech, based in Kent UK. The Fury has been successful in competition with cars racing in many championships, including the 750 Motor Club's RGB (Road-Going Bike-Engined Kitcar) and Kitcar series.

The original model has a tube frame with a rocker arm front suspension, and uses the transmission, rear axle, steering rack, and certain other parts from the Escort Mark II. There have since been two versions of rear suspension developed for the Fury: the Live Axle version uses the Ford Escort rear axle, located using two trailing links in conjunction with a Panhard rod. Coil over shock absorbers are used to give ride comfort combined with handling and grip. The Independent Rear Suspension version uses the Ford Sierra rear hub assembly in conjunction with purpose built hub carriers forming the uprights between upper and lower wishbones. Once again, coil over shock absorbers are used. The original model with an Crossflow engine weighed in at 1,270 lb (576 kg) and was 128 inches (3,250 mm) long, 54 inches (1,370 mm) wide. The wheelbase is 86 inches (2,180 mm).

Many different engines can be fitted to the Fury, including all manner of car engines from the Ford Crossflow to Rover V8 and Cosworth Turbo. Customers in the United States favored Fiat's Twin Cam engine or the Toyota 4A-GE, as these were already federalized for emissions. Motorbike engines have also been fitted and are popular for track cars due to the low weight, high power, and built-in sequential gearbox.

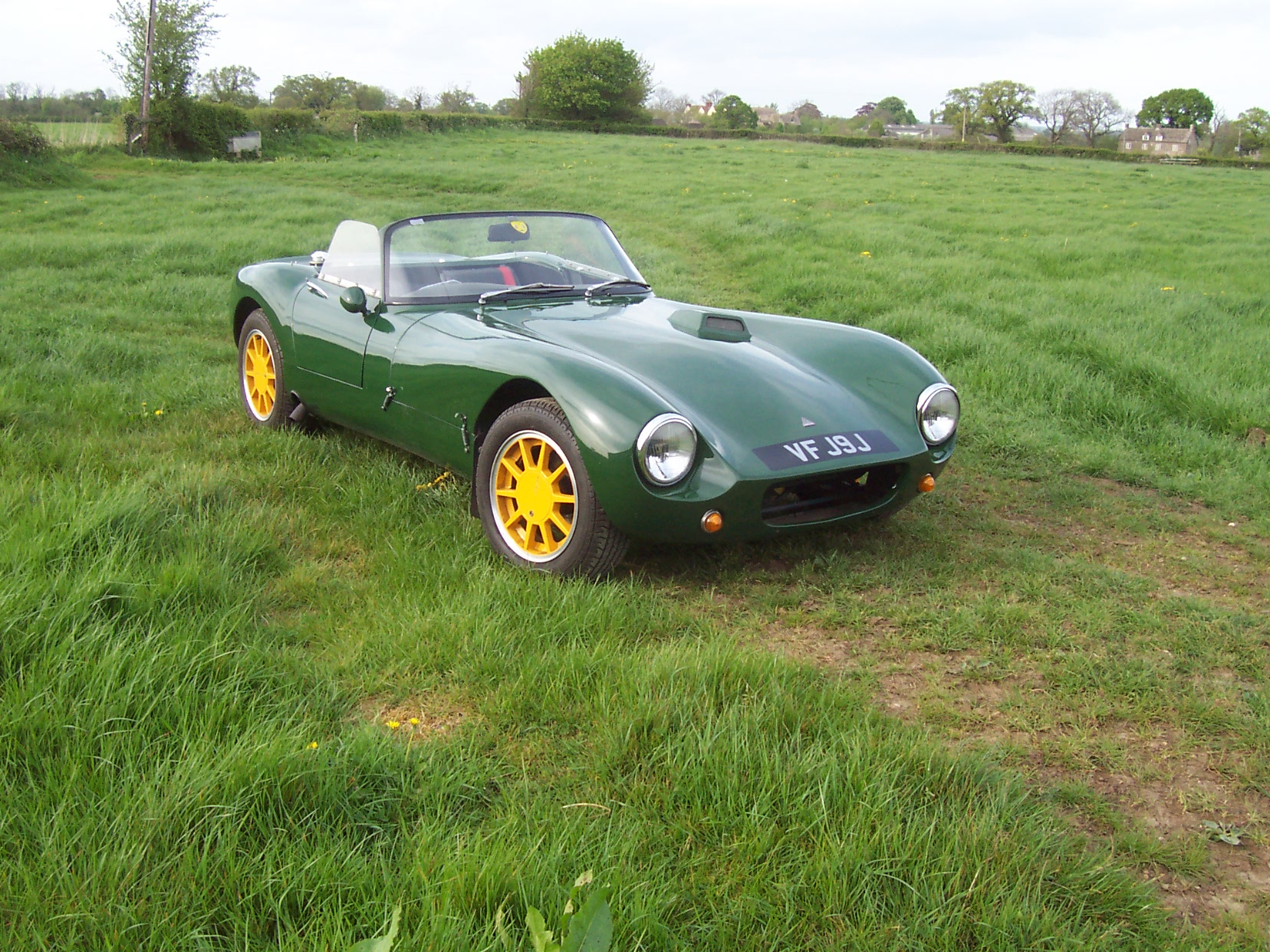
Sylva Fury with a Lancia (Fiat) Twin Cam Engine

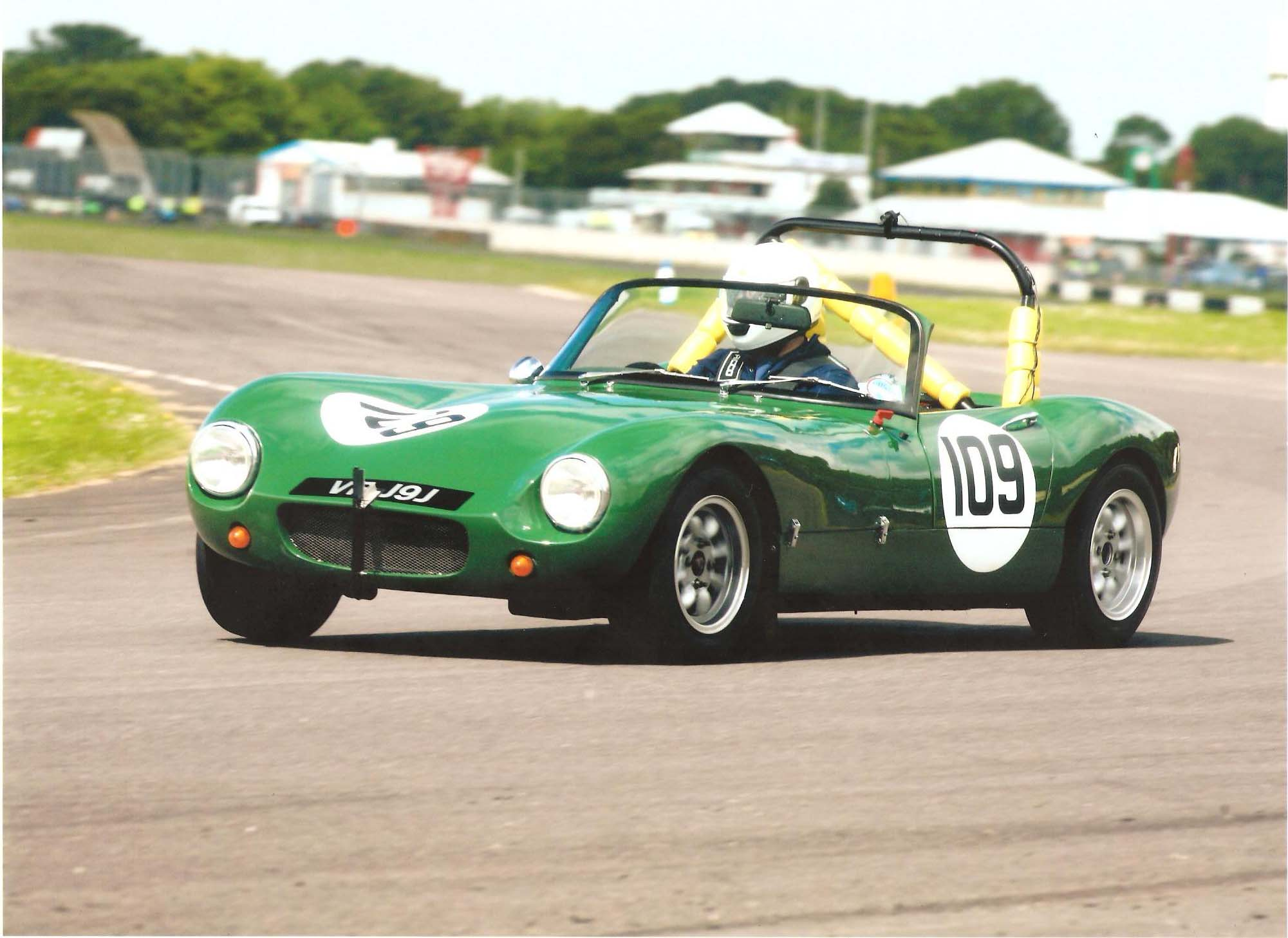
Sylva Fury at Quarry Corner (Castle Combe)

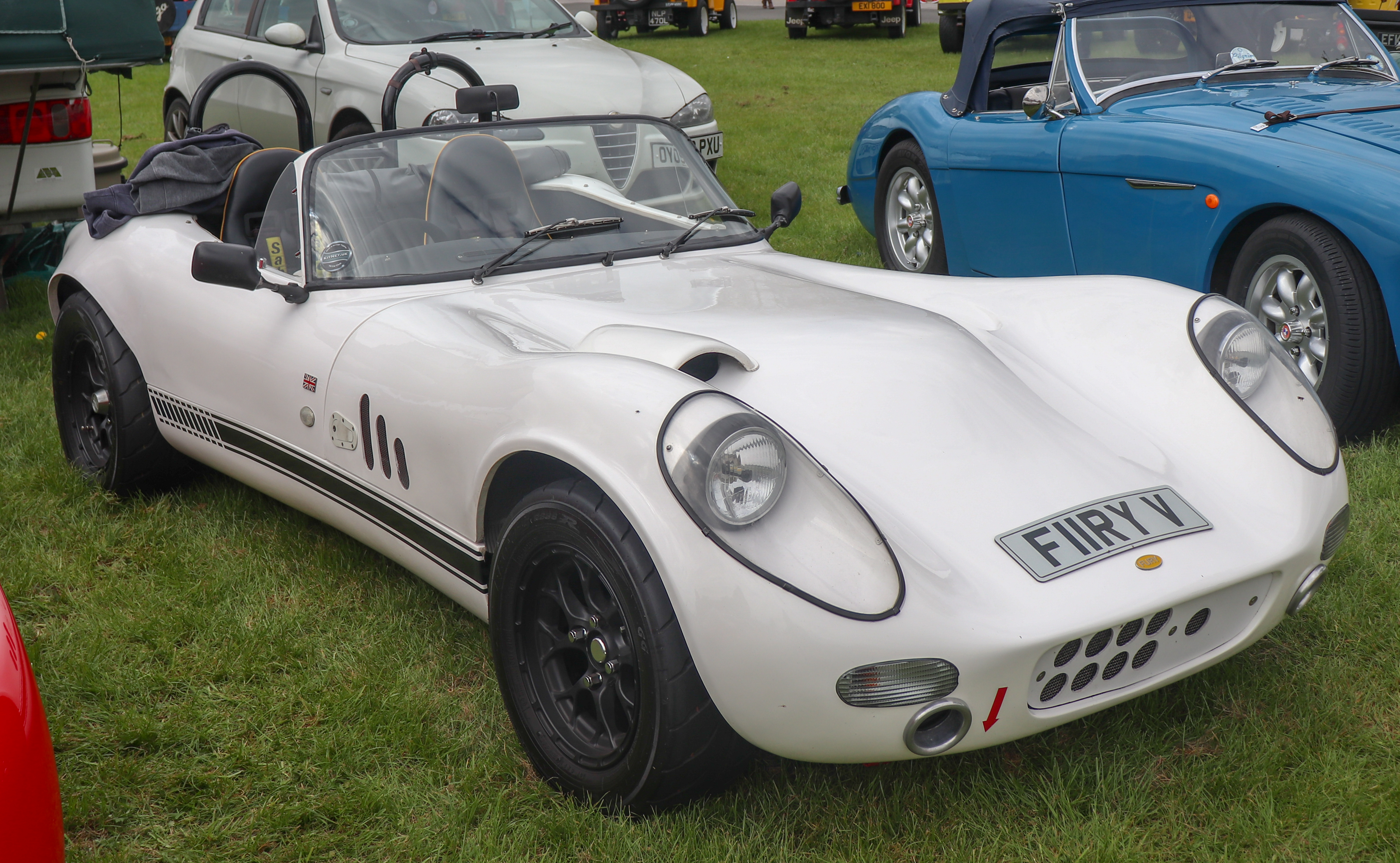
Fisher Fury

=== Stylus ===
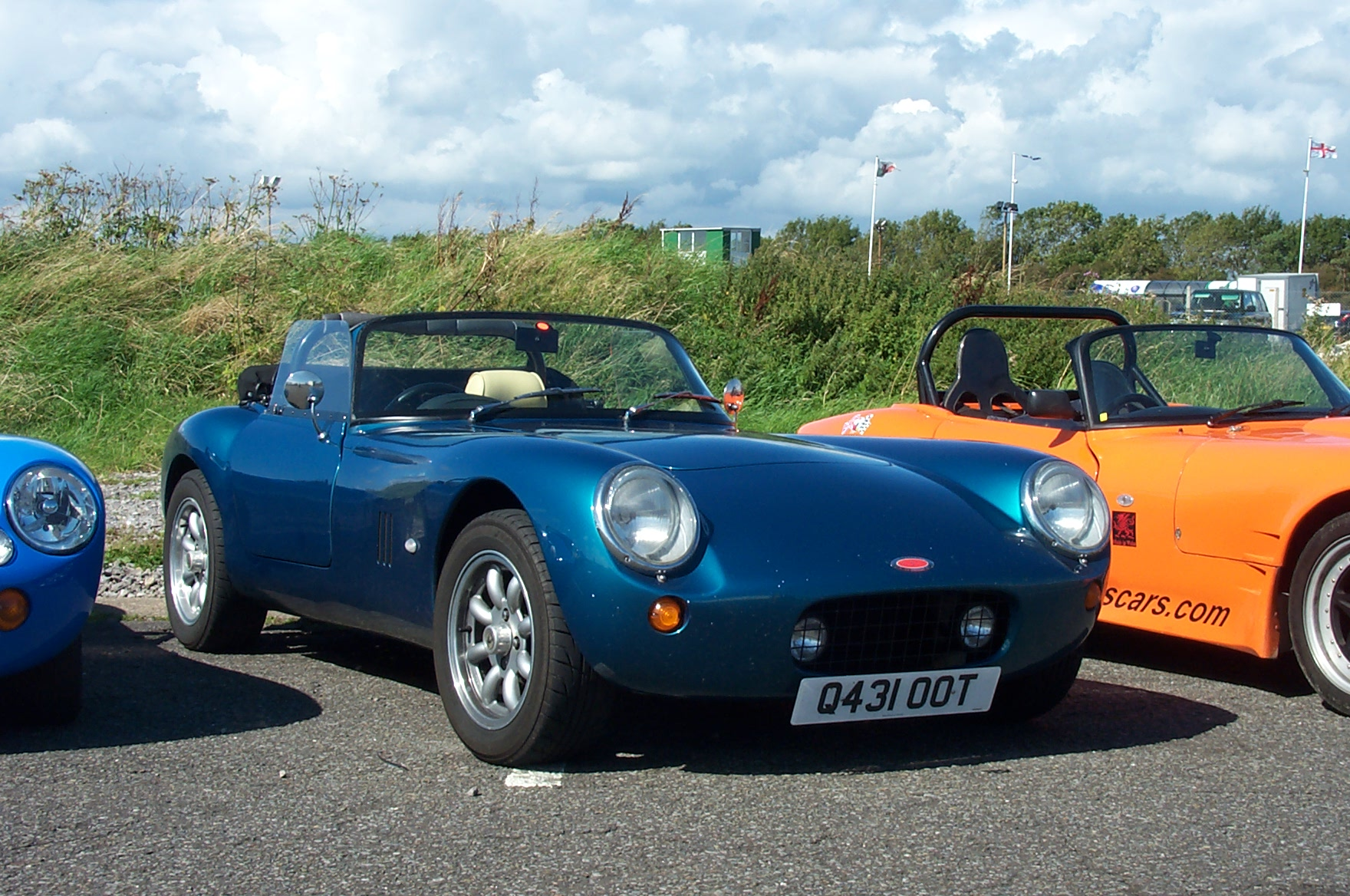
Stylus classic

Launched in 1994, the rights to manufacture the Sylva were sold to Specialist Sports Cars in 1996. SSC production began in 1997, and the company also offered finished cars.

The first Styluses used a modified Fury chassis, depending on Mark II Escort parts. Later, as these Escorts were becoming harder to find, a purpose-built chassis was made. This could also accommodate lowered doors. The front rocker arms were upgraded with needle bearings and the front lower arms got redesigned to prevent the lower ball joints being damaged. As with most Sylva models, various four-cylinder engines and the Rover V8 can be fitted.

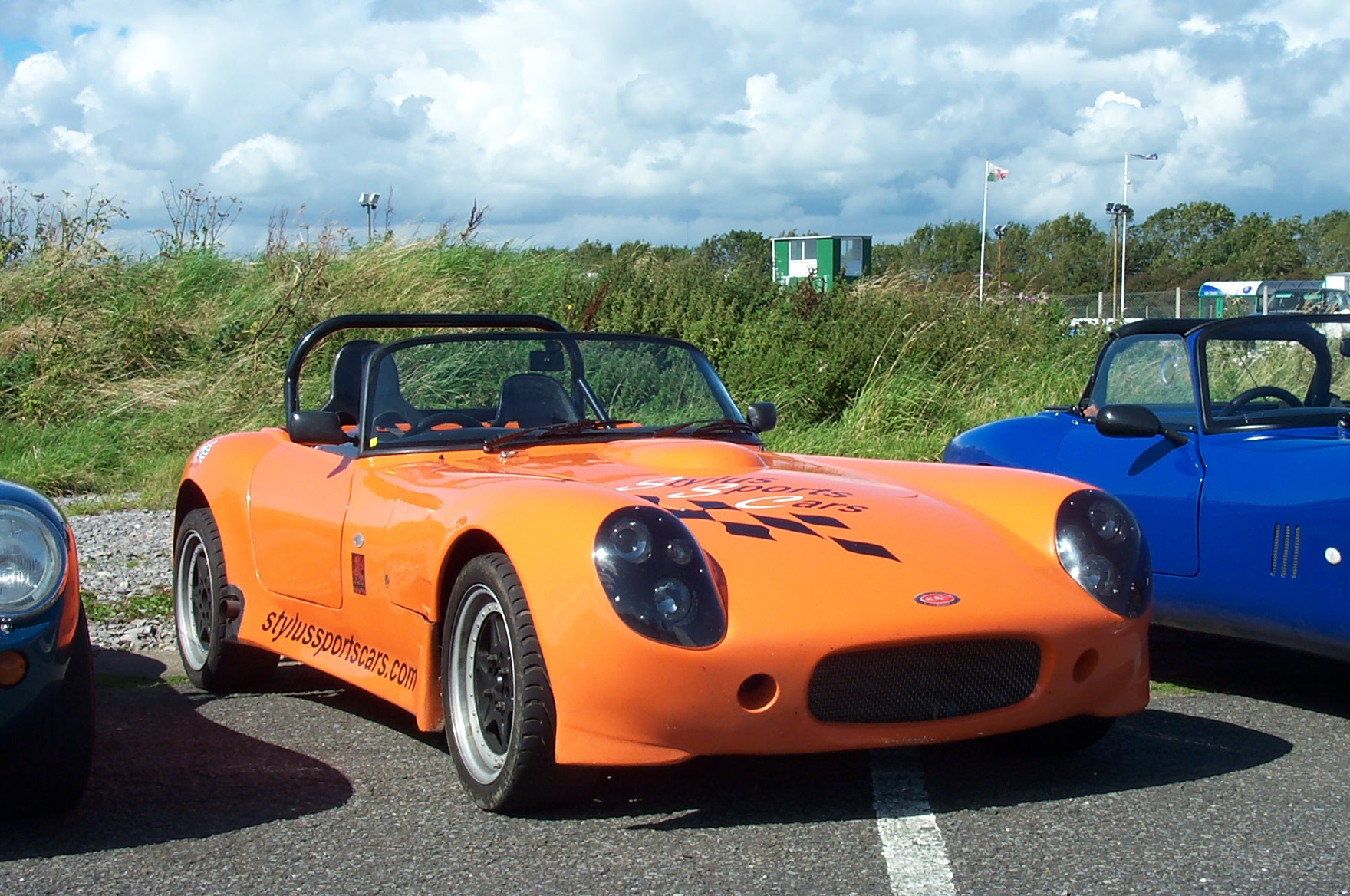
Stylus RT

In 2003, the Stylus RT was launched making it a modern looking sportscar.

The Stylus RT (Road & Track) uses the SSC standard chassis, but with wider front suspension, and uses wheel spacers at the rear or if De-Dion this can also be made wider. The rear wing was developed at Swansea University in their motorsport department. The RT also has a full front splitter and a rear diffuser. These three aerodynamic aids are optional extras. SSC fitted quad style lights. A standard Stylus can be modified to RT specification.

Specialist Sports Cars sold the rights to Stylus Sports Cars in 2004, based in mid-Wales, but this company ceased trading in 2008.

As of 2014, the Stylus returned under new ownership, located on the UK south coast. A promised MX5-based SDV version of the Stylus remains in development although it had been expected to be shown in 2017.

=== Jester ===
Mk 1 Fiesta based fun car now produced by Harlequin Autokits.

The Jester Kit has recently been bought by Stingray Motorsport in Ripley, Derbyshire. Working with Jeremy Phillips, Stingray Motorsport took the Jester through a full re-development process, the Jester now uses a more modern and easily available donor, the Ford KA. Stingray Motorsport dissolved in April 2016. The Jester is now available with adjustable AVO shocks and Cobra seats.

=== Mojo ===
The Mojo was launched in 2000. It was originally designed around the front-wheel-drive engine and gearbox from a Mk2 Fiesta, but with the whole setup fitted at the rear to give a mid-mounted transverse setup. The Ford CVH engine was standard, but other engines such as Ford Zetec, Toyota 4AGE and Renault 5 GT Turbo were also used.

The Mojo used a de dion rear suspension setup combined with another variation on the Sylva inboard front suspension design.

=== Mojo 2 ===
The Mojo 2 is a redesigned Mojo with independent double wishbone rear suspension. The body was redesigned at the rear, and two new nose designs introduced.

=== Mojo SE ===
A further development of the Mojo 2, which took the rear chassis design of the Riot SE to give a slightly longer wheelbase to accommodate a wider variety of engines. The rear bodywork was redesigned to accommodate the extra length behind the rear bulkhead.

=== Riot ===
The Riot is a motor cycle engined version of the Mojo 2. The original version used a Yamaha R1 engine and was called the R1ot. Later it was redesigned to take a Ford Zetec SE and was called Riot SE. It went on to become "Kit Car of the Year 2005".

=== J15 ===
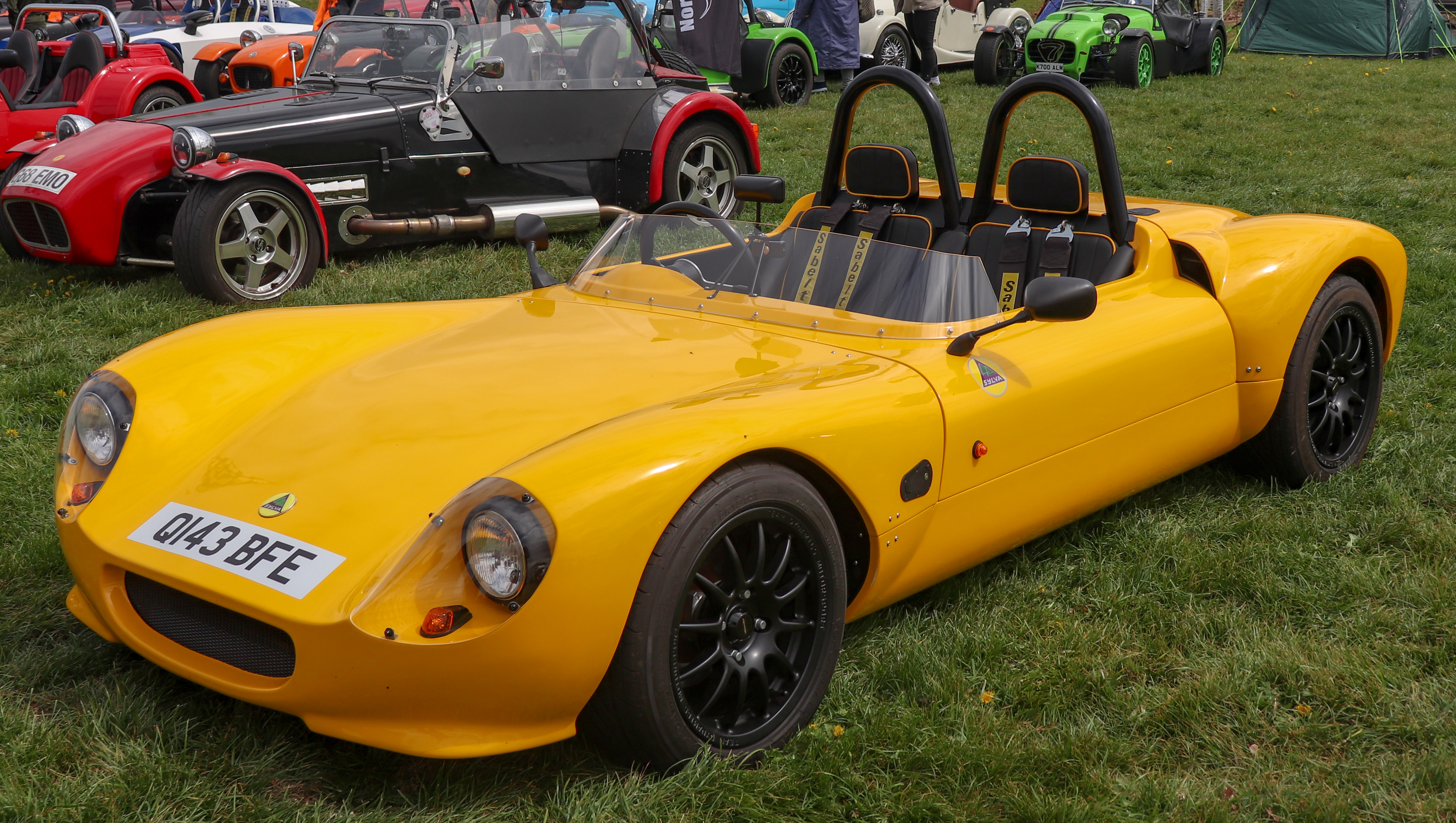
Sylva J15

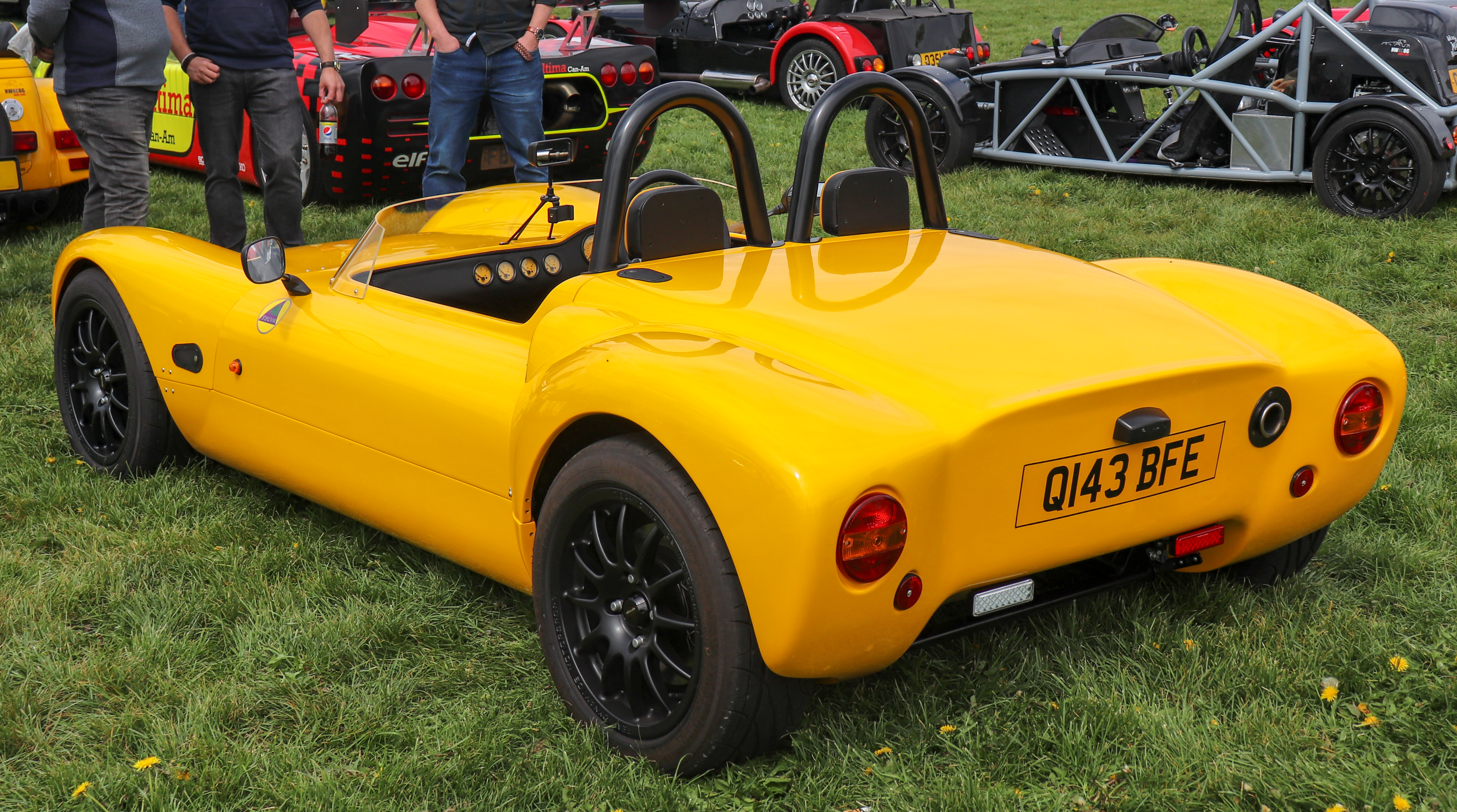
Sylva J15
