= Sylva Striker =

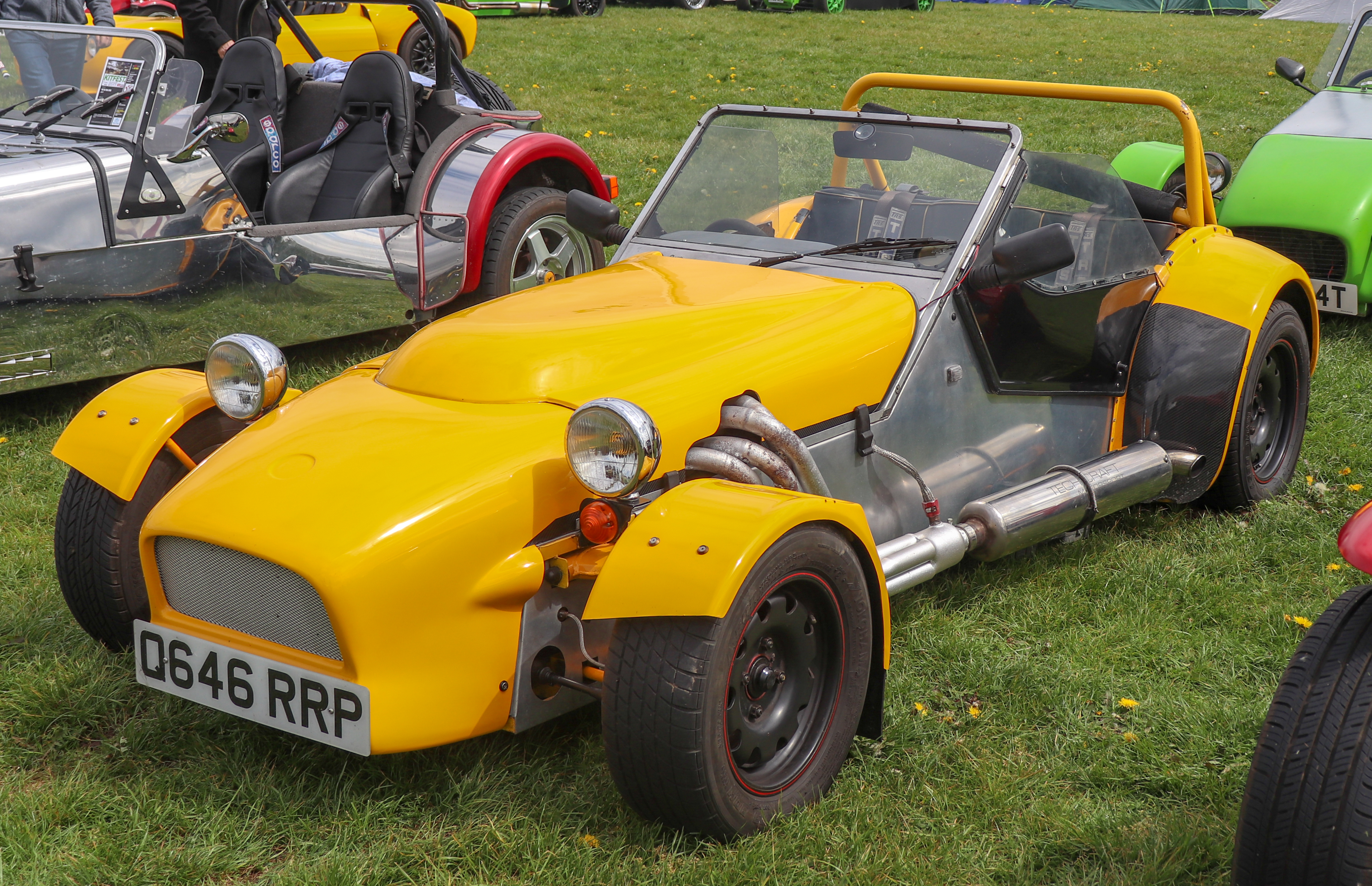
Sylva Striker (front)

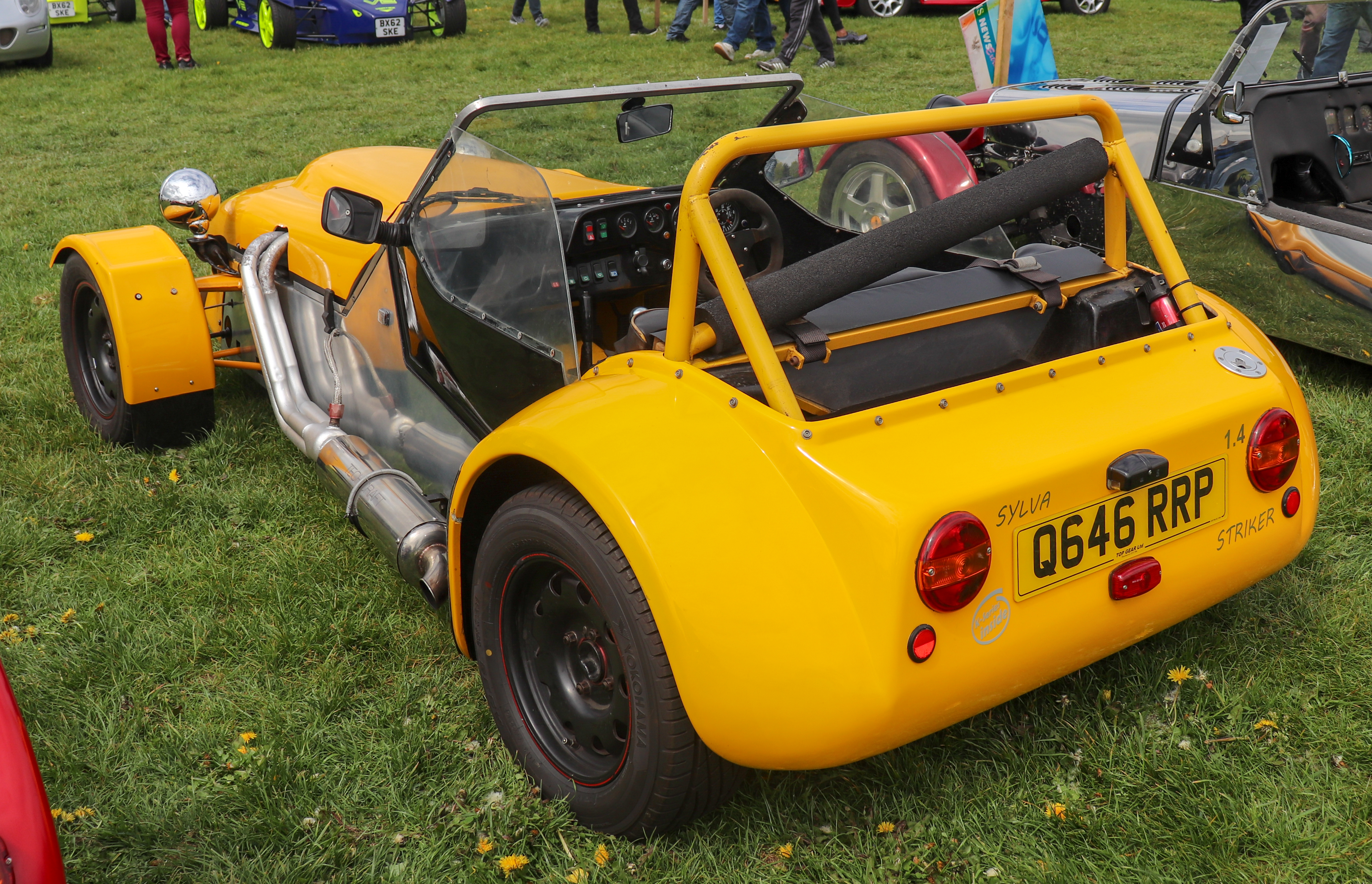
Sylva Striker (rear)

The Sylva Striker is a model of Sylva kit-car based on the Lotus Seven. The Striker has proved popular and successful on UK race tracks, most notably in the kit-car race series run by the 750 Motor Club. In 2002, Raw acquired the rights to the Striker and made a number of modifications and variations.

== Development ==
The car was a radical evolution from the Star and Leader models, dropping the Viva donor car in favour of purpose-built suspension and lighter bodywork. The car was aimed at two markets, the home car builder that required an economical kit that could be built using readily available mechanics tools and the more demanding race car builder who favoured good handling and simple design.

== Technical details and variations ==
The Striker was available in kit form, and could be built with a variety of engines, for example a Ford Crossflow, Ford Zetec, Toyota Twin-cam or even a motorcycle engine. These cars have high power-to-weight ratios and are best enjoyed in the summer due to minimal weather protection. The Mk 4 version of this car, known as the Phoenix, was manufactured from 1988-1999 and also manufactured in New Zealand from 1989.

The front suspension initially had outboard springs and shock absorbers, but with later versions, this was moved inboard with a rocker arm upper suspension arm. There were two types of rear suspension offered: one with a live axle, located by trailing arms, leading arms and a panhard rod. The other had independent rear suspension. In the UK all kit-cars are put through the SVA (Single Vehicle Approval) to obtain a road vehicle licence.
