= Rob Striker =

Microbiologist and infectious diseases physician

Robert T. Striker
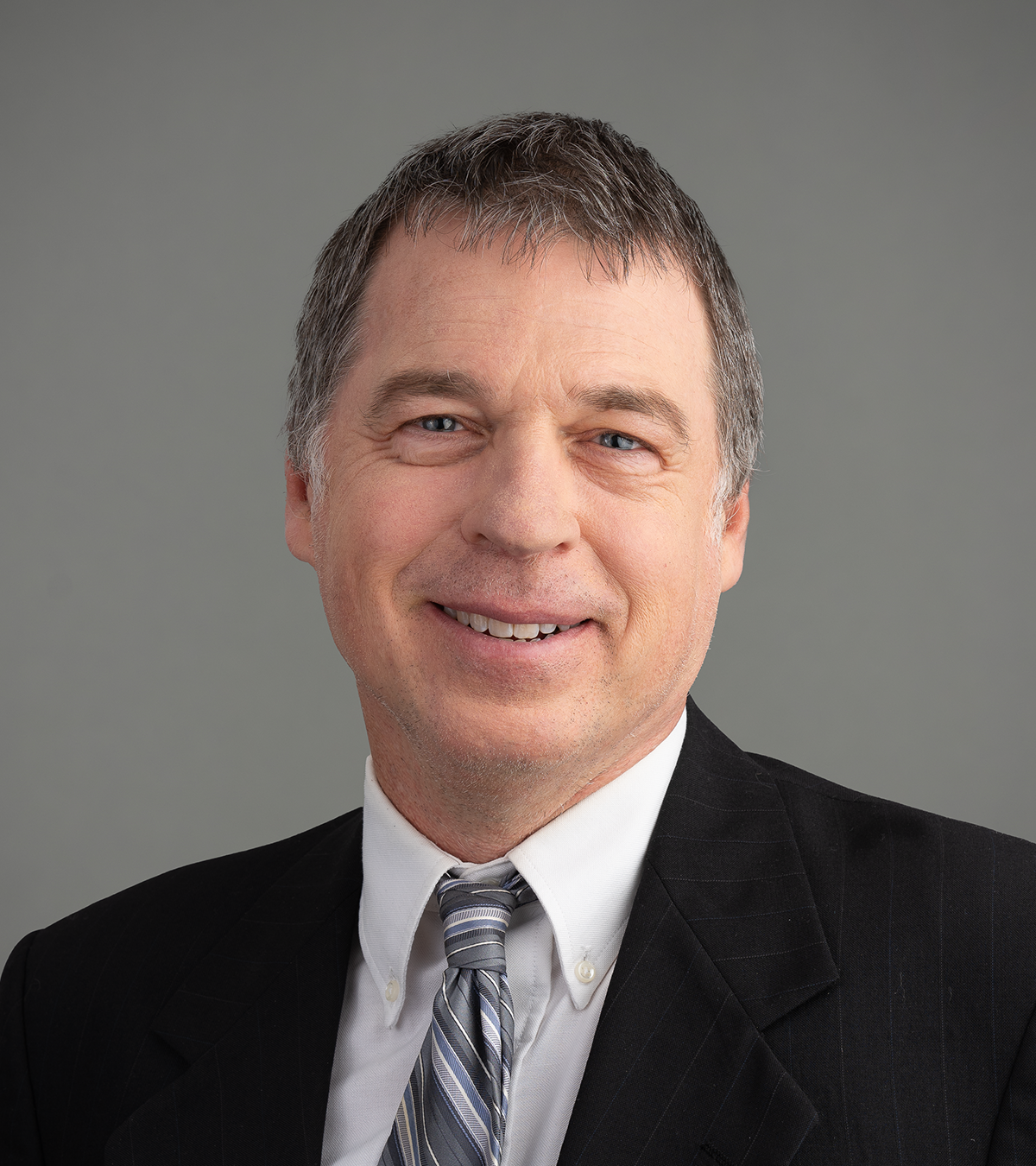
- Headshot of Robert Striker
- Born: November 17, 1965 (age 60); Cincinnati, Ohio, US
- Education: M.D. and PhD, Washington University in St. Louis
- Spouse: Laura Knoll
- Scientific career
- Fields: Virology, Immunology
- Workplaces: University of Wisconsin-Madison School of Medicine and Public Health
- Website: The Game of T-Cells – UW–Madison (wisc.edu)

Robert T. Striker is a microbiologist and infectious diseases physician at the University of Wisconsin School of Medicine and Public Health, serving as a faculty member in the Division of Infectious Disease. His work specializes in viral hepatitis and antiviral therapy, aiming to improve therapy for human infectious diseases.

== Early life and education ==
Striker was born and raised in Cincinnati. He attended Purdue University, graduating in 1988. He then attended medical school at Washington University School of Medicine, where he graduated in 1995 and received both an M.D. and PhD in Biochemistry. His thesis project was under the supervision of Scott J. Hultgren on the role of P pili attachment factors that are required for most urinary tract infections. He then completed his residency in internal medicine at California Pacific Medical Center in 1998. In 2001, he completed a fellowship in infectious diseases at Stanford University Medical Center, which included bench research under the supervision of Dr. Karla Kirkegaard focusing on the Hepatitis C Virus (HCV).

== Career ==
Striker joined the faculty of UW-Madison in 2001, in which he continued to focus on HCV, specifically improving antiviral therapy regarding the disease. He provides care for patients with viral hepatitis, HIV, and other infectious diseases both for UW Health and Vivent Health. His more recent research work includes the clinical implications of poor CD4/CD8 ratio recovery in people living with HIV, in which it is associated with increased risk of tuberculosis and certain cancers, especially anal cancer. He blogs on the topic on his website, The Game of T-Cells.

He is also the principal investigator (PI) for a phase 3 Lyme disease vaccine study and is working on clinical trials for several other vaccines including COVID-19, and cytomegalovirus.

Striker's research has received support and funding from the National Institutes of Health, the American Cancer Society, the Hartwell Foundation, the Wisconsin Partnership Program, the UW Institute for Clinical and Translational Research, and the Veterans Association. He is a member of the American Association for the Study of Liver Diseases and the American Society of Transplantation. He is also a founding member of the National Hepatitis in Corrections Network, and a fellow of the Infectious Diseases Society of America.
