= The Striker (Huang novel) =

2024 novel by Ana Huang

- Author: Ana Huang
- Genre: Romance
- Publisher: Bloom Books
- Publication date: October 22, 2024
- Pages: 592
- ISBN: 978-1464223327
- Preceded by: King of Sloth

The Striker is a 2024 sports romance novel by Ana Huang, published by Bloom Books. Her thirteenth novel, it is the first in Huang's Gods of the Game series. Immediately, it became a bestseller on The New York Times Best Seller list, as well as similar lists in Publishers Weekly, USA Today, and The Straits Times.

In April 2026, Amazon MGM Studios announced the adaptation of Ana Huang’s Gods of the Game as a three-film series.

== Synopsis ==
Based on the Premier League in England, the novel follows a male footballer, Asher Donovan, as he faces difficulties with his team, butts heads with his rival-turned-teammate Vincent DuBois, and falls in love with his trainer, a former prima ballerina named Scarlett DuBois, who happens to be his rival's sister.

== Characters ==
Asher Donovan is a Premier League footballer who's considered to be one of the greatest living players. He falls in love with Scarlett DuBois—a complicated affair given that she's Vincent DuBois' sister.

Vincent DuBois is a rival to Asher Donovan and now his teammate. His feud to Asher Donovan proves costly for a championship match, after which he and Asher Donovan must train together during the off-season.

Scarlett DuBois is a former prima ballerina who retired after sustaining injuries from a serious accident. She instead teaches at a dance academy and finds herself training Asher Donovan and his team.

== Composition ==
The novel's protagonist, Asher Donovan, originally appeared in Huang's previous novels, Twisted Hate and King of Sloth. After first introducing him to her "universe of characters" in 2022, Huang decided to write a sports romance in order to temporarily take a break from her seven-part Kings of Sin series, further explore the character of Asher Donovan, and attempt an approach to romance different from her usual "billionaire romances." In an interview with Business Insider, Huang elaborated several of the challenges she faced in writing a "sports romance" for the first time. Huang intends her Gods of the Game series to span three novels in total.

For her novels, Huang typically enlists the help of "alpha readers" who read and provide feedback for her manuscripts as she writes them. With The Striker, Huang involved alpha readers who were knowledgeable in football and ballet to help inform and shape the novel.

== Critical reception ==
Elle India included the novel on a recommendations list at the end of October 2024. The Observer included it on a list of reads for autumn.

Cosmopolitan published an excerpt of the novel on October 16 with the headline, "Ana Huang's 'The Striker' is The Hottest Sports Story You'll Read All Year". The Mesa Press lauded Huang's new direction to the romance genre and found lots of novelty in how Huang wrote the character of Scarlett DuBois.
