= Strake (disambiguation) =

A strake is a strip of planking or plating on a ship's hull.

Strake may also refer to:

- Strake (aeronautics), an element on a fuselage of an aircraft for controlling air flow
- Grouser, a traction-improving pattern on the surface of a wheel or track
- Screed, a tool for tamping and levelling
- An edge feature in automotive design
- Strake Jesuit College Preparatory, a Catholic private high-school in Houston, Texas, named for George W. Strake
