= Vanderbilt 'N Printemp's Lucky Strike =

- Other name: Striker
- Breed: Samoyed
- Sex: Male
- Born: June 2016
- Occupation: Show dog
- Title: WKC Working Group Winner
- Term: 2021 & 2022
- Owners: Judie Elford; Marc Ralsky; Correen Pacht
- Parents: Cabaka's Happy Go Lucky(sire); Vanderbilt's Cherry Brandy(dam)

Vanderbilt 'N Printemp's Lucky Strike, better known as Striker, is a male Samoyed dog. He was the Westminster Kennel Club Dog Show's 2021 and 2022 Working Group Winner.

== Information ==
Striker was born in June 2016 in Canada. His parents are Happy Go Lucky and Cherry Brandy. His owners claim that he was notable since birth and said that he "always had that X factor".

Striker won multiple awards by 2018, including Best Baby Puppy in Shows, Best In Show and Best of Breed en route to becoming a Canadian and American Grand Champion. He won four Best in Show awards in 2018. In 2019, he became the Canadian all-time winning samoyed in points and Best in Show awards. His 2020 season was interrupted by the COVID-19 pandemic, but Striker won 23 Best in Show awards finished the year as the top samoyed winner. 2021 was Striker's most successful year as he finished the year as the top ranked dog amongst all breeds, capturing 111 AKC Best in Show awards. Striker also won his biggest award at the time - The Westminster Kennel Club Dog Show's 2021 Working Group Winner. Striker's victories also helped his handler, Laura King, capture the 2021 Professional Handler of the Year award. Strikers successes continued in 2023, as he again became The Westminster Kennel Club Dog Show's 2022 Working Group Winner. Striker retired from competition in 2022.

== Personal life ==
Striker is said to enjoy toys for smaller dogs and gummy bears.
