= Strykers Bowl =

Entertainment centre in Tamworth, England

Coordinates: 52°37′47.83″N 1°41′44.33″W

Strykers Bowl is an entertainment centre in Tamworth, Staffordshire, owned by Namco. It operates under their Namco Funscape chain of bowling allies and arcades. It contains 26 tenpin bowling lanes, a Clyde's Bar and Grill formerly a Wimpy restaurant, a health and fitness centre, a play Area called Pac-Man play, a Costa Coffee outlet, and a large coin-slot arcade called Namco Station. The arcade used to be called Sega Park until 2001, when the arcade was sold to Namco. Before that the Arcade was where the Gym is today and was known as Sega World, which itself replaced a laser tag centre.

There are also 2 night-clubs adjacent including 'Kube', which has regular live music from respected dj's.

An outdoor skate-park had been added underneath the raised road, which included a half-pipe and a funbox, although they often became waterlogged in heavy rain. This was demolished in 2008 and rebuilt in 2009 by Freestyle, thanks to local grants and the Youth Capital Fund. It was re-located adjacent to the main Playground within the Castle Grounds, replacing one of several Tennis Courts.
