= Straker =

Straker is an English surname. Notable people with the surname include:

- Anthony Straker, English-born Grenadian footballer
- Arthur Straker, English first-class cricket player
- D. Augustus Straker, Barbados-born lawyer and jurist, first black lawyer to appear before the Michigan Supreme Court
- Emile Straker, Barbadian musician
- Granville Straker, American music businessman and record producer
- Les Straker, baseball player
- Sir Louis Straker, deputy prime minister and foreign minister of Saint Vincent and the Grenadines
- Nick Straker, English musician, of the Nick Straker Band

Fictional characters:

- Edward "Ed" Straker and his son Johnny Straker, fictional characters in the television series UFO
- Kevin Straker, the name of the "Ken" character in the Japanese version of the video game Street Fighter 2010
- Richard Straker, a character in Stephen King’s 1975 horror novel ’Salem’s Lot.
- John Straker, a character in Sir Arthur Conan Doyle’s 1892 story The Adventure of Silver Blaze.

== See also ==
- Straker-Squire, a former car makers in England
- Strake (disambiguation)
