= Raw Striker =

Raw Striker Ltd.
- Industry: Automobile
- Founded: 1999
- Defunct: 2021
- Headquarters: Herefordshire, United Kingdom
- Products: Cars
- Website: Raw Striker

Raw Striker Ltd. (formerly Raw Engineering) was a kit car manufacturer established in 1999. In 2002 they acquired the rights to the Sylva Striker kit car, which they have since modified. It serves as the inspiration for the Fulcrum, a similar high performance sports car. Raw Striker is based in Shelwick, just north of Hereford. In August 2010 the company was purchased by Callum and Jeremy Bulmer from the original owner Mel Coppock.

Raw Striker was acquired by MK Automotive Ltd. in 2021.

== Cars ==
Raw manufacture three models, which use very similar chassis and layout. The Striker, Fulcrum and Phoenix.

=== Striker ===
Raw Striker
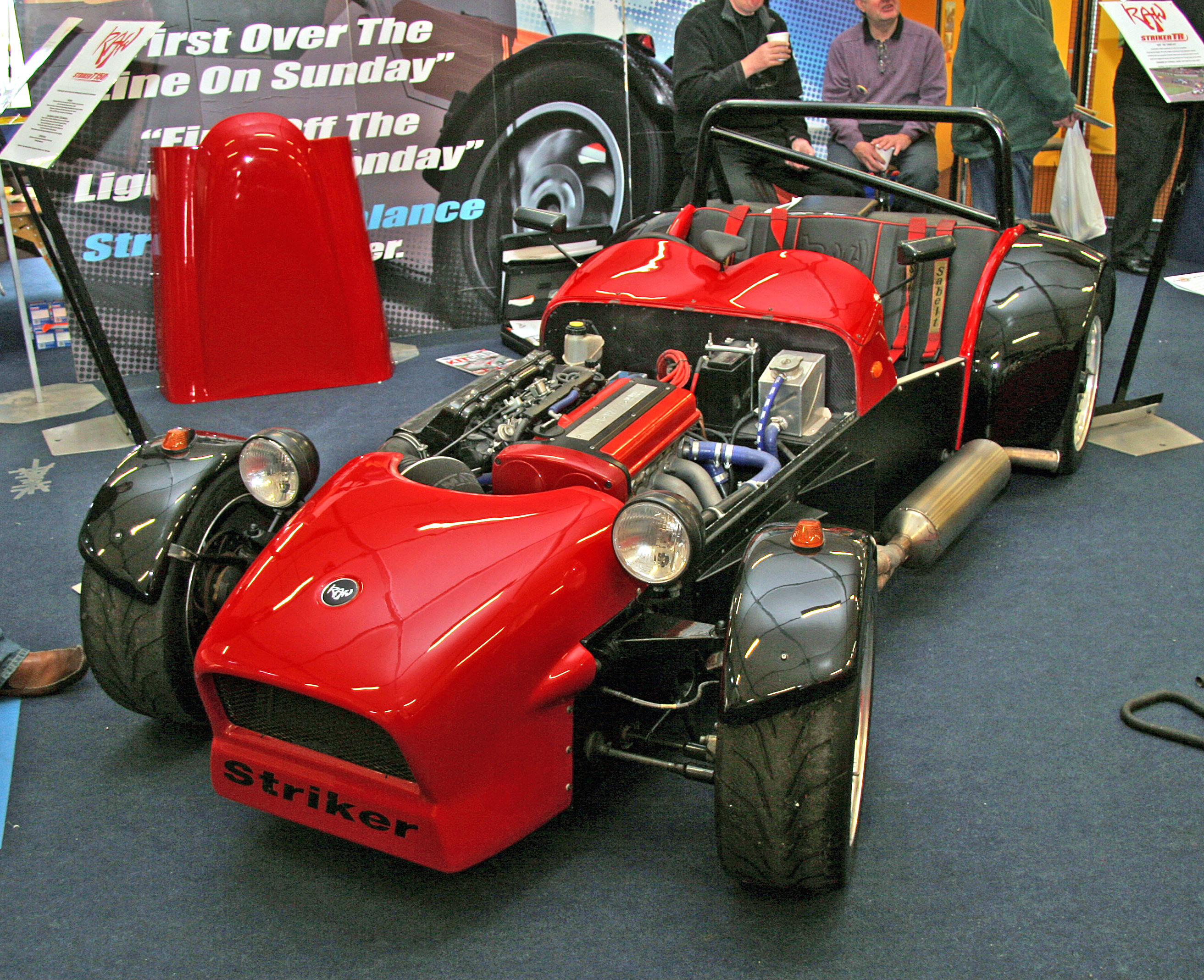

The Striker can be bought as a self-build kit, or as a partly or fully built car.

The original Raw Striker was substantially the same as the Sylva Striker, with minor changes. It is a lightweight, spartan, sports car, with a FMR layout. There is a large range of suitable engines, though Raw themselves specialise in the Toyota 4AGE engine.

The Striker is a successful racing car with particular success in 750 Motor Club races. Additionally, there is a race series only for Strikers in Ireland and another single-make series is being launched by the 750 Motor Club for Raw Strikers.

=== Fulcrum ===
The Raw Fulcrum was introduced in 2008 and is substantially the same car as the Striker. It has different bodywork without the open wings of the Striker. This closed bodywork improves aerodynamics significantly.

=== Phoenix ===
The Raw Phoenix, the latest addition to the Raw range was originally designed as an aerodynamic enhancement for the Striker chassis. The Phoenix, a smooth lined retro styled full bodied car was added to the Raw range at the beginning of 2011 to complement the others in the range.

==== Dealers ====
In addition to the Headquarters in Shelwick there are the following representatives:

- Raw Striker (North) Limited, Tingley, Wakefield, Yorkshire.
- Raw Striker East, A.B. Performance, Pie Hatch Farm, Brettenham, Buxhall, Suffolk
- Ryans Garage Motorsport, Ballindoney, Ballywilliam, Enniscorthy, County Wexford, Ireland.
