= 1949 New Year Honours =

British royal recognitions

The 1949 New Year Honours were appointments by many of the Commonwealth realms of King George VI to various orders and honours to reward and highlight good works by citizens of those countries. They were announced in supplements to the London Gazette of 31 December 1948 for the British Empire, New Zealand, India, and Ceylon to celebrate the past year and mark the beginning of 1949.

The recipients of honours are displayed here as they were styled before their new honour, and arranged by honour, with classes (Knight, Knight Grand Cross, etc.) and then divisions (Military, Civil, etc.) as appropriate.

== British Empire ==
=== Baron ===
- John Jackson Adams, OBE, JP, Director and General Manager, The West Cumberland Industrial Development Company. For political and public services.
- Major-General Sir Winston Joseph Dugan, GCMG, CB, DSO, Governor of Victoria since 1939.
- Sir John Boyd Orr, DSO, MC, MD, DSc, LLD, FRS, lately Director-General of the Food and Agriculture Organization of the United Nations.

=== Privy Councillor ===
- The Right Honourable William Malcolm, Baron Hailey, GCSI, GCMG, GCIE, Chairman, Colonial Research Committee. For services to the Colonial Empire.
- Hilary Adair Marquand, DSc, MP, Member of Parliament for East Cardiff since 1945. Secretary for Overseas Trade, 1945–1947. Paymaster General, 1947 to July 1948. Minister of Pensions, since July 1948.
- Dr. Edith Summerskill, MRCS, LRCP, MP, (Mrs. Samuel). Member of Parliament for West Fulham since 1938. Parliamentary Secretary, Ministry of Food, since 1945.

=== Knight Bachelor ===
- Ernest Charles Adams, CBE, Comptroller-General, Export Credits Guarantee Department, Board of Trade.
- Bronson James Albery. For services to the Theatre.
- John Davidson Beazley, MA, LittD, DLitt, FBA, Professor of Classical Archaeology, University of Oxford.
- Edward Clare Bligh, Chief Officer of the Welfare Department, London County Council.
- Professor Henry Cohen, MD, FRCP, JP, Professor of Medicine, University of Liverpool.
- Charles Sidney Foulsham, Chief Inspector of Taxes, Board of Inland Revenue.
- Archibald Joseph Gill, MIEE, Assistant Director-General (Engineering), General Post Office.
- William Alan Gillett, President of the Law Society.
- Edmund Henry Gilpin, Member, Export Guarantees Advisory Council, Board of Trade.
- Joseph Holland Goddard, President, Machine Tool Trades Association.
- Harcourt Gilbey Gold, OBE. For services to rowing. Chairman of the Committee of the Henley Royal Regatta Stewards.
- Hugh Ernest Griffiths, CBE, MS, FRCS. For services in the industrial rehabilitation of disabled persons.
- Henry Lewis Guy, CBE, DSc, MICE, MIMechE, FRS, Chairman of the Mechanical Engineering Research Organisation, Department of Scientific and Industrial Research; Secretary, Institution of Mechanical Engineers.
- John Hacking, MIEE. For services to the electricity supply industry.
- John James William Handford, CB, OBE, lately Assistant Under-Secretary of State, Scottish Office.
- Frank Neville Harby, CBE, Secretary, Exchequer and Audit Department.
- William Lawther, JP, President, National Union of Mineworkers.
- Andrew Hunter Arbuthnot Murray, OBE, JP, Lord Provost of Edinburgh.
- William Gammie Ogg, PhD, Director, Rothamsted Experimental Station.
- Anthony Frederick Ingham Pickford, Town Clerk of the City of London.
- Raymond Edward Priestley, MC, DSc, LLD, DL, Vice-Chancellor, University of Birmingham.
- Stanley Ford Rous, CBE, Secretary of The Football Association.
- Alan Arthur Saunders, OBE, lately Co-ordinator of Building Supplies, Ministry of Health.
- John Lionel Simonsen, DSc, FRIC, FRS, Director of Research, Colonial Products Research Council.
- Donald MacLean Skiffington, CBE, JP, Director, John Brown & Co. Ltd., Clydebank.
- Professor Sydney Alfred Smith, CBE, MD, FRCPE, Dean of the Faculty of Medicine and Regius Professor of Forensic Medicine, University of Edinburgh.
- William Ling Taylor, CBE, FRICS, Commissioner, lately Director-General, Forestry Commission.
- James Turner, President, National Farmers' Union of England and Wales.
- John Hubert Worthington, OBE, ARA, FRIBA, Architect.
- Eric Young, MInstME, MICE. For services to the coalmining industry.

Dominions

- John Clifford Valentine Behan, MA, LLD, formerly Warden of Trinity College, University of Melbourne, State of Victoria.
- Donald George Bradman, State of South Australia. In recognition of his services over many years as cricketer and captain of the Australian Test Team and for public services in several directions.
- Walter Dwyer, LLB, formerly President of the State of Western Australia Arbitration Court.
- Professor Bernard Thomas Heinze, FRCM, Ormond Professor of Music, University of Melbourne, State of Victoria.
- Errol Galbraith Knox, MBE, For public services, State of Victoria.
- The Honourable Norman Martin, Agent-General for the State of Victoria in London.
- Claude Plowman. For services to engineering and building, State of Tasmania.
- The Honourable Albert Joseph Walsh, KC, Vice-Chairman of the Commission of Government, Newfoundland.

Colonies, Protectorates, Etc.

- Cecil Furness-Smith, KC, Colonial Legal Service, Chief Justice of Trinidad and Tobago.
- Leslie Ernest Vivian M'Carthy, lately Puisne Judge in the Gold Coast.
- Sidney Bacon Palmer, CBE. For public services in the Federation of Malaya.
- Sydney Phillipson, CMG, Commissioner on special duty in Nigeria.
- Captain Frank O'Brien Wilson, CMG, DSO, Chairman of the Board of Agriculture, Kenya.

=== Order of the Bath ===
==== Knight Grand Cross of the Order of the Bath (GCB) ====
Military Division

- Admiral Sir Harold Martin Burrough, KCB, KBE, DSO, Royal Navy
- General Sir William Duthie Morgan, KCB, DSO, MC, (8038), late Royal Regiment of Artillery.

Civil Division

- Sir Henry Thomas Tizard, KCB, AFC, FRS, Chairman, Defence Research Policy Committee, Ministry of Defence.

==== Knight Commander of the Order of the Bath (KCB) ====
Military Division

Royal Navy

- Vice-Admiral George Elvey Creasy, CB, CBE, DSO, MVO.
- Vice-Admiral Reginald Henry Portal, CB. DSC.

Army

- Lieutenant-General Gordon Holmes Alexander MacMillan, CB, CBE, DSO, MC, (5880), late Infantry.
- General Sir James Stuart Steele, KBE, CB, DSO, MC, LLD, (9429), late Infantry.

Royal Air Force

- Acting Air Marshal John Wakeling Baker, CB, MC, DFC.
- Acting Air Marshal Aubrey Beauclerk Ellwood, CB, DSC.
- Acting Air Marshal John Whitworth Jones, CB, CBE.

Civil Division

- Colonel Paul Gottlieb Julius Gueterbock, CB, DSO, MC, TD, JP, DL, ADC, Chairman, Territorial and Auxiliary Forces Association of the County of Gloucester.
- Sir Thomas Ingram Kynaston Lloyd, KCMG, Permanent Under-Secretary of State, Colonial Office.
- Frederic William Metcalfe, CB, Clerk of the House of Commons.
- Sir Henry Wilson Smith, KBE, Second Secretary, HM Treasury.

==== Companion of the Order of the Bath (CB) ====
Military Division

Royal Navy

- Rear-Admiral Stephen Harry Tolson Arliss, DSO.
- Rear-Admiral Clifford Caslon, CBE.
- Rear-Admiral Philip King Enright, CBE.
- Rear-Admiral Geoffrey Alan Brooke Hawkins, MVO, DSC.
- Rear-Admiral Henry William Urquhart McCall, DSO.
- Surgeon Rear-Admiral Lionel Frederick Strugnell, MB, BS, MRCS, LRCP, KHP.
- Major-General Vivian Davenport Thomas, CBE, Royal Marines.
- Rear-Admiral Douglas Young-Jamieson.

Army

- Major-General and Chief Paymaster Cecil Norbury Bednall, OBE, MC, (18038), Royal Army Pay Corps.
- Major-General Geoffrey Kemp Bourne, CBE, (23643), late Royal Regiment of Artillery.
- Major-General Alexander Douglas Campbell, CBE, DSO, MC, BA, (5768), late Corps of Royal Engineers.
- Major-General (local) Algernon Edward Cottam, CBE, MC, (1889), late Infantry.
- Major-General Ernest Edward Down, CBE, (23809), late Infantry.
- Major-General (temporary) Frederick Harris, CBE, MC, MB, KHS, (15707), late Royal Army Medical Corps.
- Major-General Gerard William Egerton Heath, CBE, DSO, MC, (10669), late Royal Regiment of Artillery.
- Major-General Frank St David Benwell Lejeune, CBE, (15215), late Royal Regiment of Artillery.
- Major-General Francis Raymond Gage Matthews, DSO, (24375), late Infantry.
- Major-General Euan Alfred Bews Miller, DSO, MC, ADC, (11736), late Infantry.
- Major-General Hetman Jack Parham, CBE, DSO, ADC, (5899), late Royal Regiment of Artillery.
- Major-General (temporary) Alfred Eryk Robinson, DSO, (9713), late Infantry.

Royal Air Force

- The Reverend John Arthur Jagoe, CBE, DD, MA, KHC.
- Acting Air Vice-Marshal Philip Herbert Mackworth, CBE, DFC.
- Air Commodore Eric Delano Barnes, AFC.
- Air Commodore Christopher Neil Hope Bilney, CBE.
- Air Commodore Gilbert Edward Nicholetts, AFC.
- Air Commodore Adam Henry Robson, OBE, MC, MSc, PhD.
- Air Commodore Harold Vivian Satterly, CBE, DFC.
- Acting Air Commodore Arthur William Baynes McDonald, AFC.

Civil Division

- Francis Sheed Anderson, JP, Under-Secretary, Ministry of Food.
- Gilbert Tomkins Anstey, Comptroller and Accountant-General, General Post Office.
- Eric Strickland Bertenshaw, CBE, Commissioner and Secretary, Board of Customs and Excise.
- Walter Carter, CBE, lately Principal Assistant Secretary, Ministry of Transport.
- George Phillips Coldstream, Deputy Clerk of the Crown in Chancery, Lord Chancellor's Department.
- Bernard Henry Coode, Principal Clerk, House of Commons.
- Cyril George Dennys, MC, Under-Secretary, Ministry of National Insurance.
- Brevet Colonel Ernest Edward Green, TD, DL, Chairman, Territorial and Auxiliary Forces Association of the County of Glamorgan.
- Colonel North Victor Cecil Dalrymple-Hamilton, CVO, DL, Chairman, Territorial and Auxiliary Forces Association of the County of Ayr.
- Samuel Hoare, Assistant Under-Secretary of State, Home Office.
- Clifford George Jarrett, CBE, Under-Secretary, Admiralty.
- William Frank Jenkins, CBE, Under-Secretary, Ministry of Supply.
- David Lowe MacIntyre, VC, Under-Secretary, Ministry of Works.
- Wilfred John Neden, CBE, Under-Secretary, Ministry of Labour and National Service.
- George North, MC, LLD, Registrar-General.
- Gerald Hume Saverie Pinsent, CMG, Comptroller-General, National Debt Office.
- Edward Wilder Playfair, Under-Secretary, HM Treasury.
- John Cecil Glossop Pownall, Chief Charity Commissioner.
- Colonel Granville Brian Chetwynd-Stapylton, OBE, TD, JP, DL, lately Chairman, Territorial and Auxiliary Forces Association of the County of Surrey.
- Alfred Buyers Valentine, Under-Secretary, Ministry of Town and Country Planning.

=== Order of Saint Michael and Saint George ===
==== Knight Grand Cross of the Order of St Michael and St George (GCMG) ====
- The Right Honourable Wyndham Raymond, Viscount Portal, DSO, MVO. For services as President of the Olympic Games.
- Sir Ralph Clarmont Skrine Stevenson, KCMG, His Majesty's Ambassador Extraordinary and Plenipotentiary at Nanking.

==== Knight Commander of the Order of St Michael and St George (KCMG) ====
- Maurice Joseph Dean, CB, lately Deputy Under-Secretary of State, Foreign Office (German Section), now Deputy Secretary, Ministry of Defence.
- The Honourable Sir John Patrick Dwyer, Chief Justice, Supreme Court of the State of Western Australia.
- Cecil George Lewis Syers, CMG, CVO, a Deputy Under Secretary of State in the Commonwealth Relations Office.
- Sir Gilbert McCall Rennie, CMG, MC, Governor and Commander-in-Chief, Northern Rhodesia.
- Kenneth Owen Roberts-Wray, CMG, Legal Adviser to the Secretary of State for the Colonies.
- Edward Francis Twining, CMG, MBE, Governor and Commander-in-Chief, North Borneo.
- Hubert Miles Gladwyn Jebb, CB, CMG, United Kingdom Representative on the Brussels Treaty Permanent Commission and United Nations Adviser, Foreign Office.
- Frederick Robert Hoyer Millar, CMG, CVO, Minister at His Majesty's Embassy in Washington.
- Alec Walter George Randall, CMG, OBE, His Majesty's Ambassador Extraordinary and Plenipotentiary at Copenhagen.
- Geoffrey Harington Thompson, CMG, His Majesty's Ambassador Extraordinary and Plenipotentiary at Bangkok.

Honorary Knight Commander

- HH Sultan Yussuf Izzudin Shah ibni Almarhum Sultan Abdul Jalil, OBE, Sultan of Perak, Federation of Malaya.

==== Companion of the Order of St Michael and St George (CMG) ====
- Vincent Boyle, MRCVS, Superintending Inspector, Animal Health Division, Ministry of Agriculture and Fisheries.
- John Eaton Griffith, OBE. For services to the Olympic Games Organisation.
- Guy Erskine Hughes, Chief, Food, Agriculture and Forestry (British) Bi-partite Control Office, Frankfurt, Control Commission for Germany (British Element).
- Brigadier Arthur Thomas Cornwall-Jones, CBE, Senior Assistant Secretary (Military) to the Cabinet.
- Montagu Travers Morgan, MC, MD, Medical Officer of Health, Port of London.
- Eric Roll, PhD, Under-Secretary, HM Treasury.
- Arthur Frederick Rouse, Assistant Secretary, Ministry of Labour and National Service.
- Anthony Edward Welch, Under-Secretary, Board of Trade.
- Arthur Barton Pilgrim Amies, LRCP, LRCS (Edin.), FRS (Edin.), Professor of Dental Science, University of Melbourne, State of Victoria.
- Colonel The Honourable Sir Ernest Lucas Guest, KBE, CVO, Minister of Defence and Air, Southern Rhodesia.
- John Arnold Seitz, Director of Education, State of Victoria.
- John McKellar Stewart, MA, DPhil, formerly Vice-Chancellor, University of Adelaide, State of South Australia.
- Thomas Aitken Austin, LRCP, LRCS, Colonial Medical Service, Director of Medical Services, Uganda.
- William Lethbridge Gorell Barnes, Assistant Under-Secretary of State, Colonial Office.
- Edward Barry, OBE, Colonial Administrative Service, lately, Chief Secretary, Somaliland Protectorate.
- Richard Brunel Hawes, MB, BS, FRCP, MRCS, Consulting Physician to the Colonial Office.
- Brigadier Martin Hotine, CBE, Director of Colonial Surveys and Surveys Adviser to the Secretary of State for the Colonies.
- Seymour Argent Sandford Leslie, Colonial Administrative Service, Financial Secretary, Tanganyika.
- William Alexander Macnie, OBE, Colonial Secretary, Leeward Islands.
- Captain Arthur Francis Newbolt, Director of Recruitment (Colonial Service), Colonial Office.
- Ambalal Bhailalbhai Patel. For public services in Kenya.
- Geoffrey Martin Puckridge, Colonial Administrative Service, Financial Secretary, Gold Coast.
- Commander James Grenville Pyke-Nott, Royal Navy (Retired), Colonial Administrative Service, Administrative Officer, Nigeria.
- Major Basil William Seager, OBE, Colonial Administrative Service, British Agent, Western Aden Protectorate.
- Arthur Sleep, Colonial Administrative Service, British Adviser, Johore, Federation of Malaya.
- James David Maxwell Smith, Colonial Administrative Service, Financial Secretary, Singapore.
- Matthew Thomas Audsley, Labour Adviser to His Majesty's Embassy and British Middle East Office, Cairo.
- Paul Henry Gore-Booth, Head of the European Recovery Department of the Foreign Office.
- Arthur Gaitskell, Sudan Manager, Sudan Plantations Syndicate Ltd.
- Alfred John Gardeners, CBE, Head of the Establishment and Organisation Department of the Foreign Office.
- Geoffrey Wedgwood Harrison, Minister at His Majesty's Embassy at Moscow.
- George Clinton Pelham, until recently Counsellor (Commercial) at His Majesty's Embassy at Bagdad.
- D'Arcy Patrick Reilly, OBE, Counsellor at His Majesty's Embassy at Athens.
- Peter William Shelley Yorke Scarlett, Head of the Far Eastern Department of the Foreign Office.
- Richard Langford Speaight, until recently Counsellor at His Majesty's Embassy at Cairo.
- Bertram Sidney Thomas, OBE, PhD, DLitt, DSc, lately Director of the Middle East Centre for Arab Studies, Shemlan.
- Charles Wodehouse Williams, MBE, Director of Education, Sudan Government.

Honorary Companion

- Haji Mohamed Sheriff bin Osman, CBE, Mentri Besar, Kedah, Federation of Malaya.

=== Royal Victorian Chain ===
- Most Reverend and Right Honourable Geoffrey Francis Fisher, DD, Lord Archbishop of Canterbury.

=== Royal Victorian Order ===
==== Knight Grand Cross of the Royal Victorian Order (GCVO) ====
- Major-General Sir Harold Augustus Wernher, Bt, KCVO, TD.

==== Knight Commander of the Royal Victorian Order (KCVO) ====
- Commander (S) Ernest Dudley Colles, CVO, OBE, Royal Navy (Retired).
- Sir William Gilliatt, CVO, MD, MS, FRCP, FRCS, FRCOG.

==== Commander of the Royal Victorian Order (CVO) ====
- Marion Kirk Buthlay, MVO.

==== Member of the Royal Victorian Order (MVO) ====
At this time the two lowest classes of the Royal Victorian Order were "Member (fourth class)" and "Member (fifth class)", both with post-nominal letters MVO. "Member (fourth class)" was renamed "Lieutenant" (LVO) from the 1985 New Year Honours onwards.

Fourth Class

- Major Edward William Spencer Ford.
- William Weir, FCIS.

Fifth Class

- Acting Flight Lieutenant Alan John Lee (197598), Royal Air Force.
- Lieutenant (S) Robert Thompson, Royal Navy (Retired).
- Flight Lieutenant Ernest Brian Trubshaw, (150725), Royal Air Force.

=== Order of the British Empire ===
==== Knight Grand Cross of the Order of the British Empire (GBE) ====
Civil Division

- Sir (William) Wilson Jameson, KCB, MD, FRCP, KHP, Chief Medical Officer, Ministry of Health and Ministry of Education.

==== Dame Commander of the Order of the British Empire (DBE) ====
Military Division

- Matron-in-Chief Gladys Taylor, CBE, RRC, Princess Mary's Royal Air Force Nursing Service (Retired).

Civil Division

- Myra Curtis, CBE, Principal of Newnham College, Cambridge. Lately Chairman of the Committee on Children deprived of a normal home life.
- Anne May Curwen, CBE, National General Secretary, Young Women's Christian Association of Great Britain.
- Alix Hester Marie Kilroy (Lady Meynell), Under-Secretary, Board of Trade.

==== Knight Commander of the Order of the British Empire (KBE) ====
Military Division

Royal Navy

- Engineer Rear-Admiral Sydney Oswell Frew, CB.
- Vice-Admiral Harold Richard George Kinahan, CB, CBE.

Army

- Lieutenant-General Gerald Walter Robert Templer, CB, CMG, DSO, OBE, (15307), late Infantry.
- Lieutenant-General Frederick George Wrisberg, CB, CBE, (10125), late Royal Regiment of Artillery.

Royal Air Force

- Air Vice-Marshal John Whitford, CB, CBE.

Civil Division

- Brigadier (Retired) Iltyd Nicholl Clayton, CBE, lately Political Adviser to the Head of the British Middle East Office, Cairo.
- Arthur Ronald Fraser, CMG, MBE, Minister (Commercial) at His Majesty's Embassy in Paris.
- Brigadier Gerald Thomas Fisher, CSI, CIE, lately British Military Governor of Somaliland Protectorate.
- Khan Bahadur Muhammed Abdul Kader Makawi, OBE. For public service in Aden.

==== Commander of the Order of the British Empire (CBE) ====
Military Division

Royal Navy

- The Right Reverend Monsignor Edward Dewey,VG, Chaplain.
- Surgeon Captain Robert Walsh Mussen, MD, BCh, MRCP (Lond.).
- Captain (S) Herbert Guy Pertwee, DSO.
- Captain (E) Owen William Phillips, (Retired).
- Rear-Admiral (E) Henry Stewart Roome.
- Instructor Captain John Cecil Neave Taylor, MEng.

Army

- Colonel (temporary) Thomas Geoffrey Brennan, OBE, (50228), Royal Regiment of Artillery.
- Brigadier (temporary) Frederick Graham Coleman (11048), Royal Army Ordnance Corps.
- Controller (temporary) Mary Francis Coulshed (196327), Auxiliary Territorial Service.
- Colonel (temporary) Philip Basil Cuddon, MC, (5747), The Loyal Regiment (North Lancashire).
- The Reverend Alan Munro Davidson, MC, MA, DD, KHC,(31108), Chaplain to the Forces, First Class, Royal Army Chaplains' Department.
- Colonel (temporary) Robert Kenah Exham, OBE, MC, (36543), The Duke of Wellington's Regiment (West Riding).
- Brigadier (temporary) John Bunfield Hickman, MC, MA, (13046), late Royal Corps of Signals.
- Colonel (temporary) Harold Leslie Lendrum, AMIEE, (17229), Corps of Royal Engineers.
- Colonel Charles Morgan Paton, CVO, (9333), late Infantry.
- Brigadier (temporary) James Dewar Russell, DSO, MC, (12804), late Infantry
- Colonel (acting) Arthur John Henry Sloggett, DSO, OBE, TD, (12774), County Cadet Commandant, Devon Army Cadet Force.
- Colonel (temporary) Frederick Wren, MBE, (10195), Royal Army Educational Corps.
- Brigadier Storr Garlake, Commander of the Military Forces and Military Adviser to the Government of Southern Rhodesia.

Royal Air Force

- Air Commodore Eric Scott Burns.
- Air Commodore Bertram Edward Essex.
- Air Commodore John Gerald Franks.
- Group Captain Patrick Edwin Berryman.
- Group Captain Walter Graemes Cheshire.
- Group Captain John Mutch.
- Group Captain Edward George Northway, OBE.
- Group Captain Victor Henry Batten Roth.
- Group Captain Brian Courtenay Yarde.
- Acting Group Captain John Clayton Sisson, DFC.

Civil Division

- Sir Michael Francis Joseph McDonnell, Chairman, English Division of the Appellate Tribunal for Conscientious Objectors.
- Donald Cyril Vincent Perrott, Deputy Secretary, Ministry of Food.
- Bernard Kerr White, Chief Registrar of Friendly Societies and Industrial Assurance Commissioner.
- Griffith Goodland Williams, CB, Deputy Secretary, Ministry of Education.
- The Right Honourable Clarence Napier, Baron Aberdare, Chairman, National Association of Boys' Clubs.
- Reginald John Ayres, OBE, Deputy Accountant-General, Ministry of Fuel and Power.
- Philip Stanley Barber, DSO, MC, Governing Director, Edward Barber & Son Ltd.
- Alexander Baillie Barrie, Partner, McClelland, Ker & Company.
- Major Kenneth Macdonald Beaumont, DSO, British representative, Legal Committee, International Civil Aviation Organization, Montreal.
- Algernon Henry Blackwood, Author.
- Atholl Blair, MBE, MIMechE, MINA, Engineer Manager and Director, Harland & Wolff Ltd., Belfast.
- Alderman Walter Bradley, JP, AMIMechE, Chairman, National Joint Industrial Council for the Road Passenger Industry.
- Henry George Brotherton, General Secretary, National Union of Sheet Metal Workers and Braziers.
- Oliver Vaughan Snell Bulleid, MIMechE, Chief Mechanical Engineer, Railway Executive, Southern Region.
- William Arthur Bullough, MSc, MB, ChB, County Medical Officer for Essex.
- Alderman Albert Whitfield Stone Burgess, JP, Chairman, Port of Bristol Authority.
- Harold George Buss, FRICS, FAI, Deputy Chief Valuer, Board of Inland Revenue.
- John Reginald Caseley, MICE, Deputy Director of Opencast Coal Production, Ministry of Fuel and Power.
- Hope Elizabeth Hope-Clarke, OBE, Founder and Honorary Organiser, the Silver Thimble Fund.
- Howard James Butler Clough, Director of Finance, War Office.
- Cecil Rawlins Coleman, Hosiery Controller, Board of Trade.
- Herbert Cecil Coleman, MC, Assistant Secretary, Ministry of Pensions.
- Edgar Tom Cook, MusD, FRCM, FRCO, Organist and Master of the Music, Southwark Cathedral.
- Philip Andrew Cooke, OBE, MC, Director of Engine Production, Ministry of Supply.
- Thomas Daish, MC, Assistant Secretary, General Post Office.
- Leonard Charles Dashfield, OBE, Assistant Controller, HM Stationery Office.
- Major Charles Frederick Fellows Davies, OBE, Deputy Inspector-General, Royal Ulster Constabulary.
- Thomas William Deeves, MC, Assistant Secretary, Ministry of Food.
- Astra Desmond (Gwendolyn Mary Neame), Singer.
- Colonel Wallace Charles Devereux, FRAeS, Managing Director, Almin Ltd.; Chairman, International Alloys Ltd.
- Leonard Gordon Duke, Assistant Secretary, Ministry of Education.
- James Durno, Chairman, North-Eastern Agricultural Executive Committee.
- Dorothy Dymond, Principal, City of Portsmouth Training College.
- Arthur Isaac Ellis, FSA, Keeper in the Department of Printed Books, British Museum.
- Collis William Evans, Under-Secretary, Ministry of Civil Aviation.
- Ivor George Evans, Assistant Secretary, Department of Scientific and Industrial Research.
- John Farleigh, RE, RBA, President of the Arts and Crafts Exhibition Society.
- Leslie Gordon Potterton Freer, Permanent Secretary, Ministry of Health and Local Government, Northern Ireland.
- Ralph Eliot Gomme, OBE, Assistant Secretary, Ministry of Labour and National Service.
- Cecil Charles Wemyss Goodale, OBE, Director of Contracts, Ministry of Works.
- Arthur Green, MC, Assistant Solicitor, Ministry of National Insurance.
- Captain Leonard Henry Green, Secretary, National Joint Industrial Council for the Flour Milling Industry.
- Mary Agnes Hamilton, Director, American Information Department, Foreign Office.
- John Hammond, MA, FRS, Reader in Agricultural Physiology, University of Cambridge.
- Edgar Phillips Harries, Secretary of the Trades Union Congress Organisation Department. For services to the Air Ministry.
- Reginald Thomas Hawkins, Assistant Secretary, Scottish Education Department.
- Lieutenant-Colonel Frederick Guy Hill, MC, MICE, Deputy Chief Engineer, Ministry of Health.
- John Stuart Hill, FRICS, Chief Land Commissioner, Ministry of Agriculture and Fisheries.
- Frank Leonard Hirst, Chairman of the Bacon Importers National (Defence) Association.
- Alderman Arthur Hollins, JP. For services as a member of the Pottery Working Party and as Chairman of the Silicosis Medical Scheme Board.
- Colonel Evan Austin Hunter, OBE, WS. For services as Secretary, British Olympic Association.
- Captain Ralph Lowther Jolliffe, Honorary Catering Adviser to the Royal Air Force.
- The Reverend Albert Evans-Jones (Cynan), Recorder of the Gorsedd of Bards. For services to Welsh Drama and Literature.
- Edward Charles Henry Jones, OBE, Secretary, National Savings Committee.
- Harold Jones, Director of Imported Meat, Ministry of Food.
- Alderman Mary Latchford Kingsmill Jones, OBE, JP, Lord Mayor of Manchester.
- John Kerr, Inspector-General of Waterguard, Board of Customs and Excise.
- David Gilbert Logan, JP, MP, Member of Parliament for the Scotland Division of Liverpool since 1929. For political and public services.
- Donald Mackenzie, MM, Deputy Regional Director, North Eastern Region, General Post Office.
- John William McKillop, JP, lately County Clerk of Inverness-shire.
- John MacLean, Chief Scottish Adviser to the Ministry of Food on Home-Grown Cereals.
- George Henry McNeil, lately Director, Ship Management Division, Ministry of Transport. (Now serving under the Control Commission, Germany (British Element).)
- Norman Manson, MB, ChB, Warden, Hospital of St. John, Jerusalem.
- Geoffrey Isidore Charles Marchand, Member of the National Juvenile Employment Council.
- Archibald Cook Marshall, JP, Director of Education for Clackmannanshire.
- Alderman Frederick Messer, JP, MP, Member of Parliament for South Tottenham, May 1929 to October 1931, and since 1935. For political and public services.
- James Allan Milne, Chairman and Managing Director, J. Samuel White & Co. Ltd., Cowes.
- Donald William Mitchell, Assistant Secretary, Ministry of Supply.
- James Mitchell, Managing Director, Iron and Steel Production, Stewarts & Lloyds Ltd.
- Reginald Eric Jennens Moore, MBE, Assistant Secretary, Board of Trade, Director, British Industries Fair.
- Beatrix Justina Dunbar, Lady Dunbar-Nasmith, OBE, Deputy Superintendent-in-Chief, St. John Ambulance Brigade.
- Professor Frederick Henry Newman, DSc, PhD, ARCS, FInstP, AMIEE, Chairman, Exeter Joint Recruiting Board.
- Frank Nicholl, Member of the Special and War Service Grants Committees, Ministry of Pensions.
- Colonel John Ryland Pinsent, DSO, Chairman, Civil Service Selection Board.
- William Bentley Purchase, MC, MB, MRCS, LRCP, HM Coroner for the Northern District of London.
- Margaret Helen Read, MA, PhD, Head of the Colonial Department, Institute of Education, University of London.
- Alderman Joshua Ritson, JP, Member of Parliament for the Durham Division, 1922–31, and 1935–45. For political and public services.
- Henry Rowland, OBE. For public services in Glamorganshire.
- Arthur Edward Slater, Assistant Secretary, Air Ministry.
- Edward John Smith, Chairman, Wales Joint Committee for the Building Industry.
- Matthew Arnold Bracy Smith, Painter.
- Lieutenant-Colonel Walter Campbell Smith, MC, TD, ScD, Keeper, Department of Mineralogy, British Museum (Natural History).
- Cyril Douglas Spragg, Secretary, Royal Institute of British Architects.
- John Stewart, Chairman, Retail Trade Wages Councils.
- Joseph Whiteley Stork, MA, Headmaster, Royal Naval College, Dartmouth.
- Thomas Andrew Harding Sycamore, Secretary, Food Industries Council.
- Alderman George Edwin Taylor, JP, Chairman, Nottinghamshire Agricultural Executive Committee.
- Alderman Charles Terry, OBE, JP, Chairman, Redditch, Bromsgrove and District Local Employment Committee.
- Hubert Gordon Thornley, OBE, DL, Chairman, Society of Clerks of the Peace. Clerk of the North Riding of Yorkshire County Council.
- Alderman Richard Thomas Vaughan, JP, For services as Chairman Merioneth War Agricultural Executive Committee.
- Jessie Irene Wall, Assistant Secretary, Home Office.
- Thomas Walling, Director of Education, Newcastle upon Tyne.
- Professor William Wardlaw, DSc, FRIC, Scientific Adviser to the Appointments Department, Ministry of Labour and National Service.
- David Warwick Williams, Chairman, Ocean Club Committee, Liverpool.
- John Williamson, OBE, Chief Constable, Northampton Borough Police Force.
- Harold Wilmot, President, Locomotive Manufacturers Association of Great Britain.
- Lieutenant-Colonel Edward Hamilton Everard Woodward, MC, TD, MIEE. For services to the Electricity Supply Industry.
- Rowland Tempest Beresford Wynn, MIEE, Assistant Chief Engineer, British Broadcasting Corporation.
- William Cecil Cassels, MC, British subject until recently resident in China.
- William Philip Neville Edwards, Head of the British Information Services in the United States of America.
- Robert George Goldie, His Majesty's Consul-General at Milan.
- Richard Jeffery Lockett, British subject resident in Peru.
- Francis William Walker McCombe. For services in connection with the disposal of ex-enemy assets in neutral countries.
- Stanley Rawes, OBE, British subject resident in Portugal.
- George Stanley Reed, OBE, attached to a Department of the Foreign Office.
- John Burton Cleland, MD, ChM, formerly Professor of Pathology at the University of Adelaide, State of South Australia.
- Beachamp Lennox Gardiner, formerly President of Rhodesia Chamber of Mines.
- Charles Edward Hunt, KC, formerly member of House of Assembly, Newfoundland.
- Henry Montague Spencer Lewin, Member of Newfoundland Woods Labour Board and General Manager of Bowater's Pulp & Paper Co., Newfoundland.
- Walter Melvill Marshall, Secretary for Finance, Newfoundland.
- William Roberts, MD, FRCS, MRCP, Medical Superintendent, Grace Hospital, Newfoundland.
- Arthur Tennyson Smithers, AICA, Director of Finance, State of Victoria.
- Charles Walter Burrows, Labour Adviser, Development and Welfare Organisation in the West Indies.
- Frank Simon Collier, Colonial Forest Service, Chief Conservator of Forests, Nigeria.
- Joseph Trounsell Gilbert, OBE, Colonial Legal Service, Attorney-General, Bermuda.
- Charles Walter Trevor Johnson, Colonial Administrative Service, His Majesty's Agent and Consul, Tonga.
- Victor Kenniff, MICE, MIE (Aust), MIM&CyE, Director of Public Works, Hong Kong.
- John McDonald, DFC, Colonial Agricultural Service, Director of Agriculture, Cyprus.
- Nana Amanfi III, MBE, Omanhene of Asebu, Gold Coast.
- Cyril Horace Frederick Pierrepont, ED. For public services in the Federation of Malaya.
- Howell Donald Shillingford. For public services in Dominica, Windward Islands.
- Hugh Welby Skinner, MBE, Colonial Audit Service, Director of Audit, Tanganyika.
- Reginald Tottenham, Colonial Police Service, Commissioner of Police, Mauritius.
- Oswald John Voelcker, Colonial Agricultural Service, Director of the West African Cocoa Research Institute.

Honorary Commander

- Etsu Nupe, Muhammadu Ndayako Emir of Bida, First Class Chief, Nigeria.

==== Officer of the Order of the British Empire (OBE) ====
Military Division

Royal Navy

- Commander (E) Arthur Douglas Bonny.
- Honorary Lieutenant-Commander Henry Herbert Burrows, Royal Naval Volunteer (Wireless) Reserve.
- Acting Commander Anthony Tosswill Courtney.
- Acting Shipwright Lieutenant-Commander Alfred Charles De Gruchy.
- Instructor Commander Alan Robertson Edwards, MA.
- Commander John William Forrest, (Retired).
- Acting Commander (S) Richard Murray Garside.
- Lieutenant-Commander (A) Stafford Hook.
- Lieutenant-Colonel Cecil Ferndale Phillips, DSO, Royal Marines.
- Commander (L) James Bennett Reed, (Retired).
- The Reverend James Churchill Waters, MA, Chaplain.
- Engineer Commander Frank Edward Yeates, (Retired).

Army

- Lieutenant-Colonel (temporary) Alan Andrews, DSO, (66115), The Bedfordshire and Hertfordshire Regiment.
- Lieutenant-Colonel (temporary) Geoffrey Barratt (135628), The Royal Fusiliers (City of London Regiment), Extra Regimentally Employed List.
- Lieutenant-Colonel (temporary) Ronald Eric Boatman (131213), Corps of Royal Engineers.
- Lieutenant-Colonel Robert Arthur Buchanan-Dunlop (28065), The Cameronians (Scottish Rifles).
- Lieutenant-Colonel (now Colonel) (temporary) Bert Jack Osborne Burrows (97820), Corps of Royal Engineers.
- Lieutenant-Colonel Robert Gerald William Callaghan (8572), The Royal Scots Fusiliers.
- Lieutenant-Colonel (temporary) David William Clarke (74016), The Queen's Royal Regiment (West Surrey).
- Lieutenant-Colonel (temporary) John Corbett, MBE, (177901), The Royal Irish Fusiliers (Princess Victoria's).
- Lieutenant-Colonel (temporary) George Francis de Gex (50471), Royal Regiment of Artillery.
- Lieutenant-Colonel (temporary) Ronald Birch De Ritter (72902), Royal Army Service Corps.
- Lieutenant-Colonel (temporary) George Handasyde Dick (79979), Corps of Royal Engineers.
- Lieutenant-Colonel Edward Henry Du Cros (11156), Royal Corps of Signals.
- Lieutenant-Colonel (temporary) Kingsley Osborn Nugent Foster (34768), The Royal Northumberland Fusiliers.
- Lieutenant-Colonel (temporary) Paul Bentley Gore Gambier (38373), Royal Corps of Signals.
- Lieutenant-Colonel (temporary) (Quartermaster) Reginald Ernest Gibson, MBE, (98613), Extra Regimentally Employed List.
- Principal Matron Doris Girdlestone, RRC, (206163), Queen Alexandra's Imperial Military Nursing Service.
- Lieutenant-Colonel (temporary) Henry George Harborne (18487), The Royal Warwickshire Regiment.
- Lieutenant-Colonel (acting) William Francis Harling, TD, (31387), General List, Territorial Army, Marlborough College Junior Training Corps.
- Lieutenant-Colonel Thomas William Robert Hill (26974), Royal Regiment of Artillery.
- Lieutenant-Colonel (temporary) Joseph Harold Spence Lacey, BA, (367063), Corps of Royal Engineers.
- Colonel (local) Ronald Garvie Leonard (177 I.A.), Special List (ex-Indian Army).
- Lieutenant-Colonel (temporary) Marcus Lipton, MP, (168580), Royal Army Educational Corps.
- Lieutenant-Colonel (temporary) William Henry Mabbott, MBE, (76015), 12th Royal Lancers (Prince of Wales's), Royal Armoured Corps.
- Lieutenant-Colonel (temporary) (now Major) Stephen Mackenzie, (11761), Royal Army Medical Corps.
- Lieutenant-Colonel (temporary) Jock Arthur Hume Moore (68937), Royal Electrical and Mechanical Engineers.
- The Reverend Kenneth Cyril Oliver (91025), Chaplain to the Forces, Second Class (temporary), Royal Army Chaplains' Department.
- Lieutenant-Colonel (temporary) John Roy Perry (80907), Royal Army Ordnance Corps.
- Chief Commander (temporary) Mary Hope Plant (196278), Auxiliary Territorial Service.
- Lieutenant-Colonel (temporary) Frederick Albert James Pratt (355479), Corps of Royal Engineers.
- Lieutenant-Colonel (acting) Edward Roberts (14826), Special List, Territorial Army Reserve of Officers. Denbigh and Flint Army Cadet Force.
- Lieutenant-Colonel (now Colonel (temporary)) Stair Agnew Stewart (30555), Corps of Royal Engineers.
- Lieutenant-Colonel (temporary) Roy Brown Strathdee, TD, (40806), General List, Territorial Army. Aberdeen University Senior Training Corps.
- Lieutenant-Colonel Mark Buller Turner, DSO, (34406), Royal Regiment of Artillery.
- Lieutenant-Colonel (acting) John Benson Whitehead (340975), Special List, Territorial Army Reserve of Officers, Norfolk Army Cadet Force.
- Lieutenant-Colonel (temporary) Dimitry Dimitrievitch Zvegintzov (55890), The Border Regiment.

Royal Air Force

- Wing Commander Sidney George Birch (34120).
- Wing Commander Norman George Noel Davis (45765).
- Wing Commander Frederick Garrod, MBE, (43234).
- Wing Commander George Stanley John Gibbs, MBE, (43571).
- Wing Commander Harry Spencer Grimsey, DFC, AFC, (121202).
- Wing Commander Sidney Richard Carlyle Nelson, MD, MCP&S, (23273).
- Wing Commander Rudolf Peter O'Donnell, MVO, Hon. RAM, (05195).
- Wing Commander George Felix Allin Skelton (29147).
- Wing Commander Peter Guy Wykeham-Barnes, DSO, DFC, (33211).
- Acting Wing Commander Sydney Black (65339), Royal Air Force Volunteer Reserve.
- Acting Wing Commander Kenneth Frederick Mackie, DFC, (33195).
- Acting Wing Commander William George Parry (130353).
- Squadron Leader William Appleby-Brown, DFC, (90309), Royal Auxiliary Air Force.
- Squadron Leader Edward Stuart Bishop (43518).
- Squadron Leader Harold Stuart Corfield, MM, (31121).
- Squadron Leader Andrew McCallum Johnstone (48057).
- Squadron Leader George Edward Lovett-Campbell (76070).
- Acting Squadron Leader Eric Chichester Rideal (115443), Royal Air Force Volunteer Reserve.
- Wing Commander Richard James Abrahams (37663), Royal Air Force General Survey Organisation.

Civil Division

- Captain James John Cullimore Allen, Governing Director, John Allen & Sons (Oxford) Ltd.
- Arthur Vere Anderson, Deputy Director, Naval Information Department, Admiralty.
- Russell Bailey, MIMechE, Joint Managing Director, Chas. Roberts & Co. Ltd.
- Captain Frank Adam Conyers Baker, Royal Navy (Retired), Inspector, HM Coastguard, East Anglian Division.
- Edward Aston Barker. For services to the Olympic Games Organisation.
- Albert Samuel Barnes, Assistant Inspector General, Public Safety Branch, Land Niedersachen, Control Commission for Germany (British Element).
- William Barry, LLD, JP, Rector, St. Ninian's Roman Catholic High School, Kirkintilloch.
- Margaret Mary Basham, MB, ChB, County Director, Monmouthshire Branch, British Red Cross Society.
- Thomas Bell, Principal, Department of Health for Scotland.
- Thomas Bird Blayney, Higher Collector, Belfast, Board of Customs and Excise.
- Arthur Bowden, Principal, Air Ministry.
- Alfred John Brightwell, MC, Representative of the Trustee Savings Banks Association on the National Savings Committee.
- James Douglas Brown, Chairman, Local Price Regulation Committee, North West Region.
- Walter Hewitson Brown, Chief Inspector under the Children and Young Persons (Scotland) Act.
- William Henry Brown, Principal, General Post Office.
- Major Reginald Bullin, TD, JP, Chairman, Portsmouth and Gosport Local Employment Committee.
- Robert Hillhouse Burt, Principal, Colonial Office.
- Arthur James Butler, MSc. Principal Geologist, Geological Survey and Museum.
- Robert Caesar Cain, JP. For public services in the Isle of Man.
- Peter Campbell, JP. For services to the Scottish Nurses Salaries Committee.
- Robert Nightingale Campbell, Deputy Controller, Scotland Region, Ministry of Labour and National Service.
- Horace John Carr, Principal Clerk, Bankruptcy Department, Supreme Court of Judicature.
- William Watson Carstairs, JP. For services to the Scottish fishing industry. Provost of Anstruther, Fife.
- Alderman George Clark, MIMechE, JP, Chairman, Chesterfield Local Employment Committee.
- Roland Clark, Senior Partner, Perfect, Lambert & Co., Liverpool.
- Isabella Barbour Clunas, lately Matron, Lewisham Hospital.
- Thomas George Barnett Cocks, Senior Clerk, House of Commons.
- Gilbert Russell Colvin, MBE, Director of the Boot and Shoe Manufacturers Federation.
- Violet Conolly, DSc, Head of Section, Foreign Office.
- Frank Cooper, Principal, Board of Trade.
- John Cowie, Chairman, City of Glasgow Committee, Air Training Corps.
- Harry Walter Victor Crane, National Industrial Officer, National Union of General and Municipal Workers.
- George Joseph Cressall, JP. For political and public services in Poplar.
- William Herbert Currie, Deputy Finance Officer, Home Office.
- Christian Margaret Darling, Regional Administrator, Eastern Region, Women's Voluntary Services.
- Denis Neville Daunton, Assistant Chief Architect, Ministry of Works.
- Joseph Graham Davies, JP. For political and public services in Swansea.
- Daniel Dawson. For political and public services in Northumberland.
- Victor Dodd, Senior Signals Officer, Ministry of Civil Aviation.
- Charlotte Ann Douglas, MD, ChB, FRCOG, Medical Officer, Department of Health for Scotland.
- Donald Robert Duncan, Director, Public Safety Branch, Allied Commission for Austria (British Element).
- John Durham, FSAA, Treasurer, West Riding of Yorkshire County Council.
- Charles Harold Dwyer, Principal, Ministry of Labour and National Service.
- Thomas Eckersley, FSIA, Poster Artist.
- Councillor George Brand Eddie, JP. For political and public services in Blackburn.
- John Wilfred Edmondson, Principal, Ministry of Agriculture and Fisheries.
- George Ernest Edwards, Principal Clerk, Board of Inland Revenue.
- Geoffrey Richard Edwards, General Secretary, Royal Society of Medicine.
- Charles Ryves Maxwell Eley, Secretary, Central Agricultural Control Committee, Imperial Chemical Industries Ltd.
- Alexander John Ellis, MC, Chief Inspector of Training, Ministry of Labour and National Service.
- Major Arthur Bertram Entwistle, MC, Chairman, Lincolnshire County Committee, British Legion.
- Alexander Edward Thomas Farquharson, Director of Cereal Products, Ministry of Food.
- Major Le Gendre George William Horton-Fawkes, DL, Rural Land Use Adviser, North-East Region, Ministry of Agriculture and Fisheries.
- Harry Percival Firkins, Deputy Regional Controller, Ministry of National Insurance.
- William Eskdale Fishburn, Vice-President, National Federation of Building Trades Employers.
- Frederick Godfrey Fisher, Deputy Regional Controller, Ministry of Supply.
- William Fisk, MBE, FSAA, Honorary Secretary, Maidstone Savings Committee.
- Arthur Clow Ford, MBE, lately Honorary Secretary, London Regional Committee for Education among HM Forces.
- Thomas Andrew Steel Fortune, MICE, MInstT, General Manager and Secretary, Leith Dock Commission.
- Captain Hugh Perceval Ross Foster, Legal Assistant, Imperial War Graves Commission.
- Henry Thomas Fry, Principal, War Office.
- Stanley George Game, Principal, Ministry of Health.
- Commander Stanley Acton Gammon, lately of Cable Ships, Cable & Wireless
- Howard Sims Ganderton, County Surveyor of Wiltshire.
- Alderman Arthur Gardiner, JP. For political and public services in Huddersfield.
- Harold Roderick Gillman, AFRAeS, Secretary, Aerodrome Owners' Association and British Air Charter Association.
- James Gordon, Chief Engineer Officer, SS Moreton Bay, Shaw Savill & Albion Co. Ltd.
- Eliza Harriett (Lyla) Grainger, Honorary Secretary, North-Eastern Area, British Empire Leprosy Relief Association.
- Clara Ellen Grant, Honorary Warden and Secretary of Fern Street Settlement, Bow.
- Horace Campbell Hall, MIMechE, FRIC, Metallurgical Research Consultant to Rolls-Royce Ltd.
- Wing Commander Richard William Compton-Hall, FRICS, Assistant Director of Disposals, Middle East Land Forces. For services in Palestine prior to 30 June 1948.
- Clifford Montague Harris, Chief Constable of Newport, Monmouthshire.
- Ernest Harvey. For political services in Essex.
- Alfred Higson, ARCM, LRAM, ARCO. For services to Choral Music in Lancashire and Cheshire.
- George Henry Hoare, JP, Chairman, Newport, Monmouthshire, Youth Employment Committee.
- Alderman George Edward Hodgkinson. For political and public services in Coventry.
- Sydney Ernest Hooper, Director of Studies, Royal Institute of Philosophy.
- Major George Frederick Thomas Hopkins, MVO, MC, Superintendent of the Royal Mews, Buckingham Palace.
- Arthur Julius Hosier. For services to farming in Wiltshire.
- George Owen Hoskins, lately Executive Assistant to the Chief of the Supply Department, European Regional Office, UNRRA.
- Lieutenant-Colonel James Edward Blakiston Houston, County Commandant, Ulster Special Constabulary, County Down.
- Everett Howard, lately General Secretary, Ex-Services Welfare Society.
- James Howie. For services to farming in Scotland.
- Bertie Cameron Hughes, Adviser to the Sulphuric Acid Control.
- Councillor Joseph Carr Humphreys, Chairman, Sunderland Education Committee.
- Lieutenant-Colonel Robert Donovan Jackson, County Army Welfare Officer, City of London.
- Colonel Frederic Arthur Jacob, Employed in a Department of the Foreign Office.
- David Thomas Jenkins, JP. For political and public services in Glamorganshire.
- Thomas Archibald Jones, MIMinE, District Inspector, Grade C, Ministry of Fuel and Power.
- Edmund Jordan, Principal Housing Officer, North Western Region, Ministry of Health.
- Hedley George Kent, Chief Executive Officer, Ministry of National Insurance.
- Eric Euerby King, Town Clerk of West Ham. For services to town planning.
- George Basil King, Industrial Member, Midland Regional Board for Industry.
- Robert Kingan, FRIC, Senior Principal Scientific Officer, Joint Staff Mission, Washington.
- Arthur Lane, Chief of Police, Railway Executive, Western Region.
- John Andrew Lee, MIEE, AMIMechE, Construction (Transmission) Engineer, British Electricity Authority.
- Hamish Lithgow, Shipyard Manager, Swan Hunter & Wigham Richardson Ltd., Wallsend-on-Tyne.
- William Wigan Llewellin, Governor, HM Borstal Institution, Hewell Grange, Worcestershire.
- Henry Lyons, MBE, Principal, Ministry of Fuel and Power.
- Bertha Theodora McComas, Honorary Trustee of the Sandes Soldiers' and Airmen's Homes.
- Bernard John Stewart McFie, FRICS, County Agricultural Officer for Oxfordshire, Ministry of Agriculture and Fisheries.
- Lieutenant-Colonel Roderic William Macklin, MC, JP, Honorary Secretary, Cheshire Branch, Incorporated Soldiers', Sailors' and Airmen's Help Society.
- Robert John Magowan, JP. For public services in Portadown, County Armagh.
- Arthur Gregory George Marshall, Chairman of Committee, No. 104 (Cambridge) Squadron, Air Training Corps.
- Clement Frederick Marshall, MICE, Superintending Civil Engineer (Higher Grade), Admiralty.
- Arnold Stanley Martin, Director of Accounts, Ministry of Pensions.
- Alfred Henry May, Deputy Assistant Paymaster General.
- Arthur George Mears, Chief Administrative Officer, Office of the Public Trustee.
- Leonard William Francis Millis, Secretary, British Waterworks Association.
- Captain Reginald Phillips Minchin, Deputy Commander, Metropolitan Police Force.
- John Morgan, MIEE, Chief Regional Engineer, Welsh and Border Counties Region, General Post Office.
- Mary Emmeline Nanson, Principal, National Assistance Board.
- Norman Fairless Nattrass, JP, Labour Director, Northern Division, National Coal Board.
- Beatrice Naylor, MSc, Principal Scientific Officer, Royal Aircraft Establishment, Farnborough.
- Norman Edward Noble, Principal Scientific Officer, Admiralty.
- Lionel George Northcroft, MIMechE. A member of the Regional Fuel Efficiency Committee, South Western Region.
- Commander George Alan Nunneley, Royal Navy (Retired), Aerodrome Commandant Grade II, Edinburgh Airport, Ministry of Civil Aviation.
- John Arthur Older, Administrative Officer, London Fire Brigade.
- George Macaulay Painter, MC, ARIC, lately Staff Inspector, Ministry of Education.
- James Park, FCA, JP, Alderman, Salford City Council.
- Alderman the Honourable Alexander Edward Parker. For public services in Warwickshire.
- Alexander McLuckie Paul, Deputy Director of Eggs, Ministry of Food.
- Rachel Nodal Pearse, Headmistress, The Hertfordshire and Essex High School, Bishops Stortford.
- Payne Harry Pettiford, MBE, AMIMechE, Deputy Superintendent, Royal Mint.
- Lieutenant-Colonel John Frederick Alexander Pitcairn, MC, DL, Secretary, Territorial and Auxiliary Forces Associations of the Counties of Leicester and Rutland.
- Gertrude Florence Polley, General Secretary, International Co-operative Alliance.
- Wing Commander Harold Burnet Porteous, MB, ChB, Royal Air Force (Retired), Medical Officer, Board of Customs and Excise.
- Alderman Ashley Digby Potter, JP, Chairman, Rutland Agricultural Executive Committee.
- Herbert William Staddon Rew, Principal, Air Ministry.
- Harold Gilbert Reynolds, Member, National Savings Committee, representing the Eastern Region.
- Captain William Henry Wake Ridley, Royal Navy (Retired), Employed in a Department of the Foreign Office.
- Helena Roberts, Member of the Stepney Borough Council.
- William Charles Roberts, MBE, Chief Executive Officer, HM Treasury.
- David Muir Robertson, Chief Constable, Clackmannanshire Constabulary.
- William Walter Samuel Robertson, MIMechE, Vice-Chairman, Eastern Regional Board for Industry.
- Captain Alfred Robinson, Harbour Master and Pilotage Superintendent, Belfast.
- Councillor Thomas Roper. For political and public services in Nottingham.
- Leslie Allan Rose, Deputy Controller of Finance, British Council.
- Theodore Rowland, MBE, Senior Executive Officer, Commonwealth Relations Office.
- Arthur James Rudd, Clerk to the Norfolk Fishery Board.
- William Ewart Rumble, Vice-President, Potters Bar and South Mimms Savings Committee.
- Councillor Henry James Thomas Russell, JP. For political and public services in Derby.
- Elizabeth Barbara Buckley Sharp, Secretary, Institute of Personnel Management.
- Captain Robert Lewis Sheppard, Secretary, Bureau of Hygiene and Tropical Diseases.
- George Macfarlan Sisson, General Manager, Optical Works, Sir Howard Grubb, Parsons and Co. Ltd., Newcastle upon Tyne.
- Councillor Charles George Spragg, JP, Midland Region Secretary, National Federation of Building Trades Operatives.
- Aubrey Richard Starck, United Kingdom Trade Commissioner Grade II, Trinidad.
- Robert William Steele, Principal, Ministry of Labour and National Insurance, Northern Ireland.
- John Deans Stewart, Senior Inspector of Taxes, Board of Inland Revenue.
- Major Stanley Cecil Strong, MBE, Civil Assistant, War Office.
- Albert Sutehall, Head of Branch, Ministry of Education.
- Captain Maurice Gilbert Symons, Master, MV Tresillian, Main Steamship Co. Ltd.
- Alderman Francis Henry Tarr, JP. For political and public services in Exeter.
- Frank William Taylor, Chief Executive Officer, Board of Trade.
- George Taylor, FRIC, Member, Food Standards Committee.
- Godfrey Midgley Chassereau Taylor, MC, MICE, Senior Partner, John Taylor & Sons, Consulting Engineers.
- Samuel Davis Thompson, Principal, Ministry of Agriculture, Northern Ireland.
- Alderman Vincent Thompson, Chairman, Exeter Savings Committee.
- Harold John Tillson, County Homes Officer, Leicestershire County Council.
- Elizabeth Joan Tomkinson, MBE, Regional Administrator, South-Western Region, Women's Voluntary Services.
- Henry Stuart Townend. For services to the Olympic Games Organisation.
- Henry Norwood Trye, MInstT. For services as Traffic Auditor, London Passenger Transport Board.
- Maggie Unsworth, Headmistress, Parr Central Secondary Modern Girls School, St. Helens, Lancashire.
- John Vardy, Principal, Liverpool Farm School, Newton-le-Willows, Lancashire.
- Alice, Lady Waddilove. For charitable services.
- Basil Josolyne Wainwright. For services to the Olympic Games Organisation.
- Captain Rupert Healey Walley, RD, Master, SS Batavia, Anglo-Estonian Shipping Co. Ltd. (Commodore, Royal Naval Reserve. (Retired)).
- Leonard Charles Watts, Senior Principal Clerk, Board of Inland Revenue.
- Alderman Ernest Whalley, JP. For public services in Keighley.
- Frank Whyte, MC, MICE, Engineer and Manager, Caledonian Canal.
- Alfred Annan Wighton, Honorary Treasurer of the British Legion, Scotland.
- Stuart Graeme Williams, Administrative Officer, Overseas Services, British Broadcasting Corporation.
- Lieutenant-Colonel Ernest Woodhouse, Inspecting Officer of Railways, Ministry of Transport.
- Charles Victor Woods. For political and public services in Leeds and the Hartlepools.
- Frederick William Wright, FAI, Assistant Director, Ministry of Works.
- Joseph Wright, Director and General Manager, Dunlop Rim & Wheel Co. Ltd., Coventry.
- James Wyllie, Agricultural Economist, Kent and Sussex.
- Richard Ashton Beaumont, His Majesty's Consul at Jerusalem.
- Edward Boaden, lately General Manager of the Unirea Petroleum Co. of Roumania.
- Francis James Ronald Bottrall, British Council Representative in Italy.
- William Gerald Bruzaud, First Secretary (Commercial) at His Majesty's Embassy at Lima.
- Joseph Carmello Buhagiar, British subject resident in Egypt.
- John Wellington Dix, Manager, Consolidated Refineries Ltd., Haifa.
- Alexander Kidd Duthie, British subject resident in Denmark.
- Joseph Francis Ford, First Secretary at His Majesty's Embassy in Washington.
- Thomas Harrison Greene, attached to a Department of the Foreign Office.
- Peter Livingstone, lately Director of the Department of Customs and Trade of the Transjordan Government.
- Seton Howard Frederick Lloyd, Adviser to the Department of Antiquities, Government of Iraq.
- Stephen Alexander Lockhart, Head of the Information Department of His Majesty's Embassy in Brussels.
- John Otto May, until recently First Secretary (Commercial) at His Majesty's Embassy at Rome.
- Arthur Mackay Newbold, General Agent in France of British Railways.
- John Galbraith Ridland, British Vice-Consul at Spokane.
- Edward Arthur Turner, Manager in the Sudan of Barclay's Bank (Dominion, Colonial and Overseas).
- Aubrey William Barnes. For long services as Honorary Secretary of the State of Western Australia Branch of the Overseas League.
- John Charles Joseph Callanan, MD, Director of Medical Services, Swaziland.
- The Reverend Canon Edward Mallen Collick, Rector of Fremantle, State of Western Australia.
- William Charles Collins. For outstanding services in Friendly Society activities in Hobart, State of Tasmania.
- Albert James Collocott, President of the National Safety Council of Australia, and member of other civic bodies, State of Victoria.
- Marie Dalley, JP, Special Magistrate of North Melbourne Children's Court, State of Victoria.
- Richard James Garrad, Official Secretary to Agent General for State of Tasmania, in London.
- Daniel Joseph Gillis, Director of Agriculture, Newfoundland.
- Alexander Miers MacGregor, MA, formerly Director of Geological Survey, Southern Rhodesia.
- Richard Murchison Morris, MD, Medical Director and Secretary for Health, Bulawayo, Southern Rhodesia.
- George Frederick Morton, Town Clerk of City of Ballarat, State of Victoria.
- Mina Gilchrist Paddon, formerly Superintendent of International Grenfell Station at North West River, Newfoundland.
- Blanche Muriel Ross-Watt, JP, Councillor of the Shire of Gisborne, State of Victoria.
- Ernest Albert Harold Russell, MB, BS, Honorary Consulting Obstetrician, Queen Victoria Maternity Hospital, State of South Australia.
- Richard Nutter Scott, Councillor of the Shire of Korumburra, State of Victoria.
- Norman Frederick Shillingford, MBE, CA, formerly Honorary Treasurer, National War Fund, Chief Commissioner, Boy Scouts, and Officer Commanding Southern Rhodesia Police Reserve.
- Nehemiah Short, Department of Home Affairs and District Magistrate, Newfoundland.
- Wilfred Templeman, Director of Government Laboratory, Newfoundland.
- Agnes Marion McLean Walsh, Matron, King Edward Memorial Hospital, State of Western Australia.
- Esther Appleyard, Colonial Education Service, Assistant Director of Education, Gold Coast.
- Major August Schoener Arrindell. For public services in Trinidad.
- George Frederick Baxter, MRCS, LRCP, Senior Surgeon, Public Hospital, Kingston, Jamaica.
- Arthur Leslie Brice Bennett, DFC, Co-operative Adviser, Tanganyika.
- Robert Brown Black, MBE, Colonial Administrative Service, Deputy Chief Secretary, North Borneo.
- John Henry Brown, Head of Appointments Department, Crown Agents for the Colonies.
- Gilbert Browne, Agricultural Engineer, Nigeria.
- Austin Busby, Assistant General Manager of the Nigerian Railway.
- Edmund Benjamin William Carrol, Accountant-General, Gambia.
- Frederick Archibald Conrad Clairemonte, Commissioner of Income Tax and Death Duties, Barbados.
- John Coelho, MBE, Commissioner of Lands and Works, Gibraltar.
- Henry Collin, MICE, Deputy Director of Public Works, Uganda.
- Stanley Nicholas Day. For public services in Aden.
- Colin Eric Duff, Colonial Forest Service, Conservator of Forests, Northern Rhodesia.
- Étienne Dupuch, Editor and Proprietor of the Nassau Daily Tribune, Bahamas. For public services.
- Henry George Farrant, lately Field Secretary to the Sudan United Mission, Nigeria.
- John Fitzroy Fleming. For public services in Grenada. Windward Islands.
- Edward Carey Francis, Principal of the Alliance High School, Kenya.
- George Giglioli, MD, MRCP, Honorary Government Malariologist, British Guiana.
- Lay Teik Gunn, Acting Senior Chemist, Agriculture Department, Federation of Malaya.
- Robert Edward Hart. For public services in Mauritius.
- Thomas Legerwood Hately, Secretary of the Land and Agricultural Bank of Kenya.
- Gerald Hawkins, Secretary, for Defence, Singapore.
- John Roland Hill, ASAA, Municipal Treasurer, Singapore.
- Henry King Irving. For public services in Fiji.
- Richard Charles Lee. For public services in Hong Kong.
- Ian Duncan MacLennan, Chief Electrical Engineer, Public Works Department, Sierra Leone.
- Henry Evans Maude, MBE, Colonial Administrative Service, Resident Commissioner, Gilbert and Ellice Islands.
- John Robin Plowman, lately Director of Supplies and Chairman, Wartime Supplies Commission, Bermuda.
- The Reverend Benjamin James Ratcliffe, Organising Secretary, East African Inter-Territorial Language (Swahili) Committee.
- Walter Desmond Raymond, PhD, FRIC, Government Chemist, Tanganyika.
- James Stuart Wellesley Reid, Colonial Administrative Service, Acting Malayan Establishment Officer, Federation of Malaya.
- William John Scrivener. For public services in Northern Rhodesia.
- Wilfred Lawrence Skinner, lately Assistant Secretary, Colonial Administrative Service, Nyasaland.
- Calvert Milford Staine. For public services in British Honduras.
- Kathleen Wanless Storrier, MBE, Colonial Nursing Service, Sister Tutor, Gold Coast.
- Carmel Thake, Official Secretary to the Prime Minister, Malta.
- Ratu George Toganivalu, Roko Tui Ba, Fiji.
- Major Frank Denis Warren, MC. For public services in Nyasaland.
- Stephen Herbert Howard Wright, Educational Secretary-General for Protestant Missions, Uganda.

Honorary Officers

- Mohamed Hashim bin Jeragan Abdul Shukor, Orang Kaya Kaya Stia Bijaga Di-Raja, Territorial Chief of Kuala Kangsar District, Perak, Federation of Malaya.
- Francis Akanu Ibiam, Medical Practitioner on the staff of the Church of Scotland Mission, Nigeria.
- Dr. Loube Mary-Madeleine Lengauer, Medical Officer, Leprosy Control, Nigeria.
- Michael Ernest Kawalya-Kagwa, Katikiro (Prime Minister) of Buganda, Uganda.

==== Member of the Order of the British Empire (MBE) ====
Military Division

Royal Navy

- Acting Lieutenant Francis Gerald Barnard.
- Mr. William David Barrington, Gunner (T).
- Lieutenant (E) Reginald Walter Blatchford.
- Lieutenant (Acting Captain) Basil Ian Spencer Gourlay, MC, Royal Marines.
- Wardmaster Lieutenant Victor Henry Hutley.
- Second Officer Florence Mary Ingledew, Women's Royal Naval Service.
- Temporary Acting Lieutenant-Commander (Sp.) Frederick William Inns, Royal Naval Volunteer Reserve.
- Lieutenant John Mawer Larder, DSO.
- Acting Lieutenant-Commander (A) Desmond Bernard Law, DSC.
- Mr. William Howard Leaman, Commissioned Boatswain.
- Acting Lieutenant-Commander (A)(A.E.) Charles George Moore.
- Mr. James William Daniel Shell, Acting Commissioned Stores Officer.
- Lieutenant-Commander (Sp.) Frederick William Timson, Royal Naval Volunteer Reserve.

Army

- Major (now Lieutenant-Colonel (acting)) Edward James Angelbeck (15044), Royal Army Educational Corps, Regular Army Reserve of Officers, Suffolk Army Cadet Force.
- No. 294657 Warrant Officer Class I (Regimental Corporal Major) George Henry Barratt, The Life Guards.
- Major (temporary) William John Bishop (232021), Royal Army Ordnance Corps.
- Major (temporary) Frederick Thomas Albert Brehaut, MM, TD, (90090), The King's Royal Rifle Corps, Territorial Army Reserve of Officers.
- Captain (District Officer) Cecil Edward Brewer (150139), Royal Regiment of Artillery, Extra Regimentally Employed List.
- Captain (Quartermaster) Frederick Charles Churchman (221615), Royal Tank Regiment, Royal Armoured Corps.
- Major (temporary) George Reginald Coats (216704), General List.
- No. 2650752 Warrant Officer Class I (Regimental Sergeant Major) George Charles Copp, Coldstream Guards.
- Major (Assistant Paymaster) John Cowper (131187), Royal Army Pay Corps.
- Major Reginald Herbert Coxhead (181345), The Devonshire Regiment.
- Major Charles Blythe Critchley (53720), The Cameronians (Scottish Rifles).
- No. 4257900 Warrant Officer Class I (Regimental Sergeant Major) Reginald Denness, The Royal Northumberland Fusiliers.
- No. 7262239 Warrant Officer Class I (Regimental Sergeant Major) Peter Douglas, Royal Army Medical Corps.
- Captain John Duffy (195180), The Loyal Regiment (North Lancashire).
- Major (temporary) Amory Cornelius Faulkner, MC, (150690), The Devonshire Regiment.
- Captain (temporary) Cedric John Foley (267600), Royal Tank Regiment, Royal Armoured Corps.
- Major (acting) Leslie Ronald Godfrey, TD, (47743), General List, Territorial Army, Denstone College Junior Training Corps.
- Major (temporary) Alfred James Goff (125753), Royal Regiment of Artillery.
- Major (temporary) Roland Goss (271666), Royal Pioneer Corps.
- Major (temporary) James William Green (199053), Corps of Royal Engineers.
- Major (temporary) Walter James Green (153082), The Royal Fusiliers (City of London Regiment).
- Lieutenant Theodore Rutherford Harley, MA, (2882), Special List, Territorial Army Reserve of Officers, Berkshire Army Cadet Force.
- Captain (temporary) John William Charles Hawkings (104319), Royal Regiment of Artillery.
- Major (Assistant Paymaster) Victor Reginald Hazell (150099), Royal Army Pay Corps.
- Major (temporary) Villiers Archer John Heald, DSO, MC, (176902), The Dorsetshire Regiment.
- Major (temporary) Walford Charles Howell (114066), Royal Army Pay Corps.
- Major (temporary) Colin Hill Hutton (127980), Royal Electrical and Mechanical Engineers.
- Major (temporary) Harry Istead (143609) Royal Army Ordnance Corps.
- No. 4611533 Warrant Officer Class II (Regimental Quartermaster Sergeant) Charles Cyril Kenchington, The Duke of Wellington's Regiment (West Riding).
- Major (temporary) Horace Travers Lake (120585), Corps of Royal Engineers.
- Major (Quartermaster) Richard Linehan (75971), Royal Regiment of Artillery.
- Major (Quartermaster) George William Lord (131480), Royal Tank Regiment, Royal Armoured Corps.
- Major (Mechanist Officer) Fernley Marrison (65694), Royal Army Service Corps.
- No. 1024072 Warrant Officer Class I (Regimental Sergeant Major) Charles Arthur Matless, Royal Regiment of Artillery.
- No. 3650913 Warrant Officer Class I (Regimental Sergeant Major) Thomas McDonald, The South Lancashire Regiment (The Prince of Wales's Volunteers).
- No. 2968127 Warrant Officer Class I (Regimental Sergeant Major) Alexander Richardson Munnoch, The Argyll and Sutherland Highlanders (Princess Louise's).
- Major (temporary) Joseph Francis Myers (105475), The Northamptonshire Regiment.
- Captain John Alec Newbery (52746), Royal Regiment of Artillery.
- Major (Quartermaster) John Christopher Newton, MM, (70130), The Wiltshire Regiment (Duke of Edinburgh's).
- Lieutenant Raymond Cuthbert Nokes (352781), Royal Army Ordnance Corps.
- No. 5058099 Warrant Officer Class I Jack Hilliar Palman, Royal Army Service Corps.
- Major (temporary) (Quartermaster) Archibald Gordon Porteous, DCM, (159867), Royal Regiment of Artillery.
- Captain (Quartermaster) Bernard Henry Pratt (216767), Grenadier Guards.
- No. S/267059 Warrant Officer Class II (Staff Quartermaster Sergeant) Emanuel Rogers Rajadurai, Royal Army Service Corps (Ceylon).
- Major (temporary) Wilfred MacDonald Ramage (113804), Corps of Royal Engineers.
- Captain (temporary) Charles Robert Ransom (163059), 4th Queen's Own Hussars, Royal Armoured Corps.
- Major (temporary) Reginald Gower Samworth (77409) The Royal Sussex Regiment.
- Captain (temporary) David Walter Sanders (315258), Intelligence Corps.
- No. 138654 Warrant Officer Class II (Company Sergeant Major) Hilda Lilian Sanders, Auxiliary Territorial Service.
- Major (temporary) Jack Sanderson (168155), Royal Army Ordnance Corps.
- Captain (temporary) Wilfred Charles Scott (260466), Royal Regiment of Artillery.
- No. 1052667 Warrant Officer Class I (1st Class Master Gunner) Albert George Smith, Royal Regiment of Artillery.
- No. 2318142 Warrant Officer Class I (Regimental Sergeant Major) Frederick Aaron Smith, Royal Corps of Signals.
- No. S/4745687 Warrant Officer Class II (Staff Quartermaster Sergeant) Reginald Chamberlain Stewart, Royal Army Service Corps.
- Major (temporary) Anthony William Stone (311718), Royal Regiment of Artillery.
- Major (temporary) Robert Adolf Franz Stross (301539), Corps of Royal Engineers.
- No. 1873188 Warrant Officer Class II (Quartermaster Sergeant Instructor) John Vincent Taylor, Corps of Royal Engineers.
- Major Derek Terence Tewkesbury (62601), The Bedfordshire and Hertfordshire Regiment.
- Subedar Major Dalbahadur Thapa (388438), The Brigade of Gurkhas.
- Subedar Nandalal Thapa (388470), The Brigade of Gurkhas.
- Major (temporary) James Jackson Raley Trethowan (49373), The York and Lancaster Regiment.
- Major (acting) Rarulph Waye (52749), General List, Territorial Army, Radley College Junior Training Corps.
- No. S/57178 Warrant Officer Class I (Staff Sergeant Major) Arthur Ernest Williams, Royal Army Service Corps.
- No. S/5987 Warrant Officer Class I (Staff Sergeant Major) Charles William Window, Royal Army Service Corps.
- No. 847961 Warrant Officer Class I (Sergeant Major) (Artillery Clerk) William Joseph Woodburn, Royal Regiment of Artillery.
- Major Arthur Cyril Walker, formerly Southern Rhodesia Staff Corps.
- Company Sergeant-Major Marciano Francisco de Paula Baptista, Hong Kong Volunteer Defence Corps.
- Regimental Sergeant-Major Whitfield Pomeroy Burrows, British Honduras Volunteer Guard.
- Regimental Sergeant-Major Harold Bruce Gardiner Marshall, Barbados Volunteer Force.

Royal Air Force

- Acting Wing Commander Brian Arthur Cullum Duncan (78392), Royal Air Force Volunteer Reserve.
- Acting Squadron Leader Frank Lewis Jenkins (44354).
- Acting Squadron Leader Lawrence William Tordoff (51971).
- Acting Squadron Leader Charles Cledwyn Williams, MM, (125132), Royal Air Force Volunteer Reserve.
- Acting Squadron Leader John William Willis-Richards (46311).
- Flight Lieutenant Ivor Henry John Doble (49712).
- Flight Lieutenant George Gordon Herbert Ford (53790).
- Flight Lieutenant Theodore John Holmes (48177).
- Flight Lieutenant Frederick Jack Moden (50161).
- Flight Lieutenant John Edward Parr (189484), Royal Air Force Volunteer Reserve.
- Flight Lieutenant Hector Ernest Stallworthy (54779).
- Flight Lieutenant Trevor Albert John Stocker (159211).
- Flight Lieutenant George William Suddes (105964), Royal Air Force Volunteer Reserve.
- Flight Lieutenant Colin Stanley Thomas (49882).
- Acting Flight Lieutenant Gordon Henry Daniels (108325), Royal Air Force Volunteer Reserve.
- Warrant Officer William James Bangay (157384).
- Warrant Officer Alfred John Beavis (14976).
- Warrant Officer Edward Calvert (508317).
- Warrant Officer Bernard Cooke (515220).
- Warrant Officer Sidney Robert Davis (357067).
- Warrant Officer William John Goble (361679).
- Warrant Officer Stewart Edward Hammond (364415).
- Warrant Officer Thomas Henry Heslop (514005).
- Warrant Officer David Joseph Shanahan (344632).
- Warrant Officer Alfred John Wiles (22139).
- Warrant Officer Charles Jefferson Wood (364414).
- Acting Warrant Officer Rowland Stanley Cooke (355406).
- Acting Warrant Officer William Nelson West (512724).
- Section Officer Audrey Penfold (5237), Women's Auxiliary Air Force.

Civil Division

- Charles Reginald Adlam, Staff Officer, Air Ministry.
- Thomas Aitken, District Inspector, Scotland, Ministry of National Insurance.
- John Arthur Aldridge, Senior Staff Officer, Ministry of Agriculture and Fisheries.
- Betty Colthurst Alexander, Officer, Grade II, Allied Commission for Austria (British Element).
- James Allan, Colliery Manager, Dalkeith Colliery, National Coal Board, Scottish Division.
- William Harold Allen, Works Director, Gibb (Shepshed) Ltd., Leicestershire.
- Henry John Allies, MM, Engineer, North Eastern Region, General Post Office.
- Dora Lilian Hannah Allsop, Private Secretary to the Chairman, Iron & Steel Board.
- Francis Boyd Anderson, Honorary Secretary, Moneymore and District Local Savings Committee, County Londonderry.
- James Anderson, Joint Managing Director, Anderson Boyes & Co. Ltd.
- Violet Catherine Arkwright, Honorary Secretary, Warwickshire County Nursing Association.
- James Arnold, Works Production Manager, Dubilier Condensers (1925) Ltd., Kirkby, Lancashire.
- Gerald Baer, Chief Inspector, Ministry of Food.
- Millicent Jessie Eleanor Bagot, Civil Assistant, War Office.
- Florence Maud Bailey, Member, Bradford Local Employment Committee.
- George John Bailey, Managing Director, G. Bailey & Sons Ltd.
- Alfred Percy Balchin, Staff Officer, Board of Inland Revenue.
- Alderman Frederick Thomas Baldock, JP, Honorary Secretary, Poplar Savings Committee.
- William Daniel Barker, Officer in charge of Plastic Unit, Optical Appliances Department, Ministry of Pensions.
- Elsie Bastable, Assistant Matron, Pembroke County War Memorial Hospital, Haverfordwest.
- William Henry Beard, Chief Clerk, Birmingham Fire Brigade.
- Ida Florence Mildred Beaumont, Controller of Typists, Home Office.
- Arthur Beckess, Senior Executive Officer, Air Ministry.
- Albert William Beechey, Inspector of Taxes, Higher Grade, Board of Inland Revenue.
- Alderman Frank Bell, Member, Newark Local Employment Committee.
- Barzillai Beckerleg Bennetts, Honorary Secretary, Penlee-Penzance Branch, Royal National Lifeboat Institution.
- Alan Beresford, Commandant, No. 4 District Police Training Centre, Cannock.
- Ethel Binns. For services to ex-servicemen and their dependents in Cleveleys and district, Lancashire.
- Thomas John Robb Birrell, Secretary, British Legion Benevolent Department.
- Brigadier William Elliott Blakey, MM, Assistant Commercial Superintendent, Railway Executive, Eastern Region.
- Alec Edwin Blaxill, JP, Honorary Blood Transfusion Officer, Essex County Hospital, Colchester.
- Margaret Audrey Bongard, Higher Executive Officer, Ministry of National Insurance.
- Leonard Napier Bowden. For services to the National Union of Seamen.
- Herbert Bowness, Tractor Production Superintendent, Marshall, Sons & Co. Ltd.
- Robert Brettell, MIMinE, Manager, Beech Tree Colliery, National Coal Board, West Midlands Division.
- Agnes Martha Brittain, Deputy Food Executive Officer, Newmarket, Ministry of Food.
- Henry William Brookling, MC, Senior Staff Officer, Admiralty.
- Marjory Brown, Assistant County Director, Aberdeenshire, British Red Cross Society.
- Thomas Brydone, MA, JP, Headmaster, West Calder High School.
- William Buchanan, Chief Production Engineer, G. & J. Weir Ltd., Glasgow.
- Rose Minnie Buckmaster, Senior Executive Officer, Ministry of Pensions.
- Henry John Bull, Secretary and Agent, Hampshire Discharged Prisoners Aid Society.
- Albert William Burge, Machine Shop and Tool Room Superintendent, de Havilland Engine Co. Ltd.
- Maurice William Burrough, FCA, Director, Joseph Gundry & Co. Ltd.
- Mabel Moir-Byres, JP, District Administrator, North Eastern District, Women's Voluntary Services, Scotland.
- John Thomas Byrne, Secretary, Clyde District Committee, Confederation of Shipbuilding and Engineering Unions.
- Phyllis Lilian Cain, Higher Executive Officer, Central Office of Information.
- John Macrae Tod Cairncross, Manager, Leith Employment Exchange, Ministry of Labour and National Service.
- Ernest Frederick Callow, Higher Executive Officer, Ministry of Transport.
- Mary Temple Candler, Head of Copyright Department, British Broadcasting Corporation.
- Ernest Alfred Chapman, Secretary, South Wales and Monmouthshire Technical Advisory Committee.
- George Edwin Chappell, JP. For public services in Somerset.
- Frederick William John Stanley Child, General Manager, Charerat & Co., Llanelly.
- Irene Mellish Chitty, Registrar, Office of the United Kingdom Representative to Eire.
- Ethel Cairns Christie, Senior Executive Officer, Board of Trade.
- Reginald Bertram Clamp, Member, Birmingham Savings Committee.
- Samuel Clarke, Secretary-Manager, Royal Ulster Agricultural Society.
- Chryssie Glass, Honorary Secretary, Huddersfield Street Groups Savings Sub-Committee.
- John Clegg. For services as Secretary, Workpeople's Committee, Ashton Infirmary.
- Albert William Cole, JP, lately Works Director, Washington Chemical Co. Ltd., County Durham.
- Albert John Benjamin Combs, AMIMechE, Inspector, Class I, Ministry of Supply.
- Charles William Conyers, Chief Inspector, Motive Power Superintendent's Office, Railway Executive, North-Eastern Region.
- Albert George Cook, Higher Executive Officer, Home Office.
- Charles Andrew Cook, Valuation Clerk, Higher Grade, Board of Inland Revenue.
- Percy Bracey Cooke, Superintendent, London Postal Region, General Post Office.
- Captain Walter Ralph Crouch, Dockmaster, Tilbury Dock, Port of London Authority.
- William Neweomb Cryer, Chief Commissioner, National Savings Committee.
- Alison David, Secretarial Assistant, Foreign Office.
- Alexander Kinnison Davidson, General Secretary, National Federation of Roofing Contractors.
- George Stainforth Davidson, Chairman, Ashford, Middlesex, Savings Committee.
- John Keith Davidson, Member, Scottish Executive, St. Andrew's Ambulance Association.
- David Edwards Davies, Treasurer and Vice-President, Amalgamated Master Dairymen Ltd.
- Thomas Powell Davies, JP. For services to farming in Shropshire.
- Barbara Joan De Livera, Higher Executive Officer, Ministry of Transport.
- Melton Charles Dunn, Chairman, North Staffordshire District Committee, Midland Regional Board for Industry.
- John Leaburn Eadie, Senior Executive Officer, Edinburgh, Central Land Board and War Damage Commission.
- George Edward Bales, Senior Executive Officer, HM Treasury.
- William Richard Easom, Ship Manager, Silley Cox & Co. Ltd., Falmouth.
- William Henry Eborn, Governing Director, Geo. Dawson & Sons Ltd.
- Annie Litten Edmunds-Edwards, JP, Organising Secretary, Women's Land Army, North Wales Area.
- Owen Edwards, JP, Vice-Chairman, Anglesey Agricultural Executive Committee.
- Mary Olive Eeles, ARRC. For services to the National Institute for the Blind.
- Marjorie Ellison, Honorary Secretary, Salisbury Division, Soldiers', Sailors' and Airmen's Families Association.
- Patience Elizabeth Ellsmoor, Superintendent Nursing Officer, Berkshire County Council.
- Ernest Thomas English, General Secretary, Plymouth Council of Social Service.
- Charles Edward Etheridge, MB, MRCS, LRCP, Admiralty Surgeon and Agent, Whitstable.
- Derek Curtis Evans, Principal Scientific Officer, Ministry of Supply.
- Thomas John Evans, Chief Finance Officer, Carmarthenshire Education Authority.
- John Frederick Percival Fielding, ARIC, Intelligence Officer, 1st Class, Board of Trade.
- Lilian Jane Fish, Chief Woman Clerk, John Heathcoat & Co. Ltd., Tiverton.
- Lucy Doris Fish, Staff Officer, Foreign Office.
- Raymond William Fletcher. For services as Secretary, Manchester Regional Cotton Labour Committee, Ministry of Labour and National Service.
- Frederick Douglas Flowers, Assistant Clerk, Office of the Parliamentary Secretary to HM Treasury.
- Thomas Matheson Forrest, Resident Engineer, Bedfordshire County Council.
- Major Charles Joseph Howard Foulkes, Civil Assistant, War Office.
- Walter Stephen Fox, Works Manager, HM Stationery Office.
- Wilfred Francis Francis, BEM, Secretary, British Legion, Swansea.
- Frederick Ernest Fulford, Headmaster, Intermediate School for Boys, Guernsey.
- Archie Gilbert, Higher Clerical Officer, Ministry of Civil Aviation.
- Charles Frederick Gill, JP. For political and public services in Reading.
- Margaret Gilvary, Superintendent, Ilminster Avenue Nursery School, Bristol.
- William Alfred Godby, ARIC, Senior Experimental Officer, Ministry of Food.
- Hector Ernest Gooding, Superintending Sanitary Engineer, Ministry of Works.
- Duncan Graham, JP, Area Bread Officer, Northern Ireland.
- Ivy Nellie Green, Chief Superintendent of Typists, HM Land Registry.
- Vera Gertrude Griffin, Executive Officer, Ministry of Food.
- Ernest Alfred Leete Griffith, Salvage Insurance Adviser, Ministry of Transport.
- Elizabeth Charlotte Grimwade, County Borough Organiser, Ipswich, Women's Voluntary Services.
- Charles Alexander Gutsell, Chief Designer, Elliott Bros. (London) Ltd.
- May Evelyn Haarnack, Junior Executive Officer, Ministry of Health.
- Kenneth Alexander Haddacks, Armament Supply Officer, Admiralty.
- Alderman Albert Hall, JP. For political and public services in Hove.
- Hugh Leslie Stephen Hannah, Secretary to the Northern Region Price Regulation Committee, Newcastle upon Tyne, Board of Trade.
- Thomas Harbison, Superintendent Clerk, Middle East Land Forces. For services in Palestine prior to 30 June 1948.
- George Octavious Harper, lately Manager, Eden Colliery, National Coal Board, Northern Division.
- Enid Mary Hartley, JP, Member Peterborough Youth Employment Committee.
- Sidney Harry Harvey, Chairman of Managers, Cheslyn Hay and Great Wyrley Group Primary Schools, Staffordshire.
- Margaret Elizabeth (Betha) Hastings, Centre Organiser, Chelsea and Kensington, Women's Voluntary Services.
- Arthur William Head, Higher Clerical Officer, Air Ministry.
- William Ansell George Heather, DCM, Senior Staff Officer, Tunbridge Wells Regional Office, Ministry of Health.
- John Bradley Heatley, Senior Executive Officer, Air Ministry.
- James Ross Henderson, General Manager, Weldall & Assembly Ltd., Droitwich.
- George William Henlen, Senior Executive Officer, Colonial Office.
- Benjamin Hesketh, General Manager, S. & J. Prestwich (Burberrys Ltd.), Farnworth, Lancashire.
- James Richard Hickish, MINA, Naval Constructor, Admiralty.
- Arthur Laurence Higham, Engineer and Manager, Hull Station, British Gas Light Company.
- George Bonton Hillman, Executive Officer, Department of Scientific and Industrial Research.
- Courtney Leonard Hobbs, Senior Executive Officer, Ministry of Education.
- Arthur Hockley, a member of the staff of the Parliamentary Labour Party for over 37 years. For political services.
- George Alfred Holman, Head Postmaster, Slough.
- Harriet Margaret Honey, Staff Clerk, Ministry of Labour and National Service.
- Arthur Nicholas Hosking, Honorary Port Fishery Officer and Harbour Master, Looe, Cornwall.
- Henry Philip Howard, Higher Executive Officer, Board of Inland Revenue.
- Basil Philip Howell, Regional Petroleum Officer, South Eastern Regional, Ministry of Fuel and Power.
- William Guy Hudson, Member, County Fermanagh Savings Committee.
- William Hunter, Chief Draughtsman, Northern Manufacturing Co. Ltd., Gainsborough, Lincolnshire.
- Elsie Storey Hutton, Assistant for Special Duties, British Council.
- Gordon Chambers Ibbott, Chief Test Engineer, W. H. Allen, Sons & Co. Ltd., Bedford.
- Charles Victor Ingram, Staff Officer, Ministry of Finance, Northern Ireland.
- James Ireland, JP. For services as Chairman, Lisburn Board of Guardians.
- Gertrude Maud Ismay, Honorary Street Group Organiser, Hinckley, Leicestershire, Savings Committee.
- Henry Charles Ivers, Deputy Principal, Ministry of Education, Northern Ireland.
- Gertrude Jardine, Social Worker among Women Prisoners in Edinburgh.
- Albert Glenn Jefferies, Principal Clerk, United Kingdom Trade Commissioner's Office, Montreal.
- Philip Arthur Job, Director, Llanelly Steel Co. (1907) Ltd.
- John Swanston Jobling, Sub-Inspector in Durham, Mines Inspectorate, Ministry of Fuel and Power.
- Fred Johnson. For services as Master, Harton Institution, South Shields.
- Cecil David Jones, Machinery Officer, North Riding of Yorkshire Agricultural Executive Committee.
- Eric Kyffin Jones. For services as Chief Executive Officer, Wales Region, Ministry of Fuel and Power. (Now Principal, Welsh Board of Health.)
- Isaac Jones. For services to agriculture in Caernarvonshire.
- James Kenna, Head Male Nurse, Rampton State Institution.
- Charles James Kettle, Senior Executive Officer, Office of the Receiver for the Metropolitan Police District.
- Alexander Kilgour, AMIEE, Assistant Telephone Manager, Glasgow, General Post Office.
- Major William Keay Kinnear, Chief Records Officer, Imperial War Graves Commission.
- Percy Dobson Kirkman, Regional Fuel Engineer, North Western Region, Ministry of Fuel and Power.
- Thomas Howard Kissack, Chief Superintendent, Manchester City Police Force.
- Mary Moncrief Lachlan, Civil Assistant, War Office.
- Richard Landless, JP, Chairman, Burnley Local Employment Committee and Disablement Advisory Committee.
- Benjamin Ewart Laugharne, Senior Executive Officer, Welsh Board of Health.
- Marshall Lawson, lately Column Officer, Glasgow Fire Brigade.
- Herbert Leadley, Personal Assistant to Chief Secretary and Legal Adviser, British Transport Commission.
- John Henry Stanley Lemon, General Manager, Brinton's Ltd., Kidderminister.
- Alfred John Philip Le Riche, Greffier of the Royal and Ecclesiastical Court, Jersey.
- Dorothy Joan Llewellin, County Organiser, Monmouthshire, Women's Voluntary Services.
- Lionel Lynes, MIMechE, Technical Assistant for Carriages and Wagons, Railway Executive, Southern Region.
- Susan Tait Macallan. For charitable and welfare services in Rutherglen and district.
- Captain John Charles McClughan, District Commandant, Ulster Special Constabulary.
- Ellen Mary McCubbin, Regional Clothing Officer, London Region, Women's Voluntary Services.
- Ebie Buchanan MacDonald. For services to the Forces, prior to 30 June 1948, as Warden, Church of Scotland Hostel, Tiberias.
- Hugh Connell MacDonald, Chief Steward, MV Caledonia, Anchor Line Ltd.
- Horace Edward McDonnell, lately Member, Slough National Assistance Board Appeal Tribunal.
- Hector Wallace Mace, Principal Staff Officer, War Office.
- Margaret McEwan, lately Tutor to the Health Visitor Students, Royal College of Nursing.
- George McGee, DSM, Senior Fishery Officer, Scottish Home Department.
- Barbara Sarah McLeod, Superintendent of Typists, Scottish Education Department.
- Isabella Thomson Sinclair Macleod, Honorary Treasurer of the Inverness Central School Savings Group.
- John Edward Gerard McSheehy, FRICS, Chairman, Wimbledon Sea Cadet Unit Committee.
- James McVee, MM, Financial Assistant to Secretary, Territorial and Auxiliary Forces Association of the County of the City of Glasgow.
- Thomas Mahood, Honorary Secretary, Upper Ards Local Savings Committee, County Down.
- Charles Hugh Marland, Chief Mechanical Superintendent, Goole, Docks and Inland Waterways Executive.
- Gilbert Gould Marsland, MICE, Local Fuel Overseer, Cheltenham Borough and Charlton Kings Urban District.
- George Martin, Deputy Principal, Ministry of Labour and National Insurance, Northern Ireland.
- Thomas Ronald Martin, General Manager, Metal Box Co. Ltd., Neath.
- George William Mason, Senior Executive Officer, Ministry of Agriculture and Fisheries.
- Thomas Leonard Maxfield, Control Officer, Grade I, North Rhine Westphalia Control Commission for Germany (British Element).
- Henry John Meade, MM, lately Higher Executive Officer, Patent Office, Board of Trade.
- Effie Methold, Honorary Secretary, Worthing Council of Social Service.
- Philip Arthur Meyler, Superintendent, Flight Test Department, Bristol Aeroplane Company Ltd.
- David John Michael, Colliery Under-manager, Marine Colliery, National Coal Board, South Western Division.
- Major Thomas Milne, MC, Expert breeder of pedigree poultry.
- Elizabeth Helen Molyneux, Headmistress, Grafton Infants' School, Dagenham.
- Arthur James Moore, Managing Director, Cox, Moore & Co. Ltd., Nottingham.
- Cuthbert Kennedy Moore, Assistant Regional Director (Controls), Newcastle Region, Ministry of Works.
- Arthur Cuthbert Moores, Regional Coal Officer, North Western Region, Ministry of Fuel and Power.
- John George Morgan, JP, District Organiser, Northern Region, National Union of General and Municipal Workers.
- Ernest Leonard Morland, MIEE, Sub-Area Engineer, No. 1 Sub-Area, Merseyside and North Wales Electricity Board, British Electricity Authority.
- Douglas Ernest Morley, Senior Control Officer, Heavy Repair Workshops, Lubeck, Control Commission for Germany (British Element).
- Gwladys Mary Morris, Superintendent of Orthopaedic Clinics, Northern Ireland.
- Arthur Frank Mott, Staff Officer, Ministry of Education.
- David Mudie, MIMechE, JP, Chairman of the Board of Honorary Directors, Lord Roberts' Memorial Workshops, Dundee.
- Mabel Flora Munro, Higher Executive Officer, Foreign Office (German Section).
- Frederick Spencer Neate, District House Coal Officer, Portsmouth Pistrict.
- George Edgar Newbould, Machine Foreman, Thames Board Mills Ltd., Purfleet, Essex.
- Robert Thomas Newell, JP, President and Honorary Treasurer, Young Men's Christian Association, Omagh.
- Rosie Lottie Noakes, Controller of Typists, HM Treasury.
- Hubert Henry Osborn, Headmaster, Charlbury County Senior School, Oxfordshire.
- Rachel Elizabeth O'Sullivan, Honorary Secretary, Newport, Monmouthshire, Street Groups Savings Sub-Committee.
- Augusta Mary Parker, County Superintendent, County of Suffolk, St. John Ambulance Brigade.
- Councillor James Parkes, JP, Honorary Secretary, Bolton Savings Committee.
- Alexander Henry Swinton Paterson, MC, Aberdeen Representative, British Broadcasting Corporation.
- John Edward Pennifold, Senior Executive Officer, Air Ministry.
- Clifford John Pickett, MC, Under-manager, Denaby Main Colliery, National Coal Board, North-Eastern Division.
- John Edgar Plowman, Joint Secretary, Federation of British Port Wholesale Fish Merchants.
- George Ponsford, Surveyor, Litherland Urban District Council.
- Jeffrey Charles Poole, Assistant Timber Controller, Board of Trade.
- Frederick George Pope, Higher Executive Officer, Ministry of Transport.
- William Holden Pounds, Staff Clerk, Higher Grade, Ministry of Labour and National Service.
- George Harry Hugh Powell, Senior Surveyor, Air Registration Board.
- James Prince, General Secretary, Cardiff and District Branch, British Legion.
- Henry Goodwin Quinn, Superintendent and Deputy Chief Constable, Dumfries-shire Constabulary.
- Albert Reeley, lately Senior Experimental Officer, British Museum (Natural History).
- Donald Westwood Richardson, AFRAeS, Chief Instructor, de Havilland Aircraft Co. Ltd.
- Mary Margaret Robb, Honorary Secretary of a Savings Group, Jenners Ltd., Edinburgh.
- Isabel Margaret Robertson, Principal, Ulsterville Primary School, Belfast.
- Shield Rochester, MIMinE, JP, Manager, Greenside and Stargate Collieries, National Coal Board, Northern Division.
- William Ross, MIEE, Senior Executive Officer, South-West Scotland Division, British Electricity Authority.
- Hugh Rigby Rowbotham, Member, Wolverhampton District Committee, Midland Regional Board for Industry.
- Councillor George Rushton, JP. For services to the cotton production campaign in Nelson, Lancashire.
- John Charles Bruce Russell, Higher Grade Clerk, Board of Inland Revenue.
- Alfred John Ryan, National Organiser in Northern Ireland, Amalgamated Transport and General Workers' Union.
- Charles Frederick Satterthwaite, Superintendent, Metropolitan Police Force.
- John George Scott, Control Officer, Grade I, Berlin, Control Commission for Germany (British Element).
- Frank William Sellwood, MInstT, Traffic Manager, Southdown Motor Services Ltd.
- Alexander Girdwood Sharples, Manager, Pontypridd Employment Exchange, Ministry of Labour and National Service.
- Florence Shaw. For public and welfare services in Coleraine and district, Northern Ireland.
- William John Shea, Senior Executive Officer, Ministry of Transport.
- Anne Margaret Sheppard, Executive Officer, General Post Office.
- Joseph Shires, MC, Chief Regional Officer, North Eastern Region, Ministry of Pensions.
- George Shrosbree, Executive Secretary, Employers' Secretariat, National Joint Council for Civil Air Transport.
- The Honourable Rachel Beatrice Kay-Shuttleworth, JP. For public services in Lancashire.
- Robert John Silver, Chief Inspector, Rist's Wires & Cables Ltd.
- John Sinclair, Higher Clerical Officer, Cabinet Office.
- John Andrew Sloan, JP, Vice-President, Clyde Fishermen's Association.
- Archibald Rammell Small, Superintendent, Map Mounting Section, Ministry of Agriculture and Fisheries.
- David Smith, Undermanager, Ramcroft Colliery, National Coal Board, East Midlands Division.
- Edward Smith, Staff Officer, Admiralty.
- Harold James Smith, Senior Assistant Shipyard Manager, John Brown & Co. Ltd.
- Harold John Smith, JP, Chairman, Leeds, York and Tadcaster District Committee, East and West Ridings Regional Board for Industry.
- William Ernest Spencer, Chief Bakery Production Officer, Ministry of Food.
- Hilda Betty Muriel Staple, lately Assistant Secretary, Office of the High Commissioner for the United Kingdom in New Zealand.
- Clifford Stead, Honorary Secretary, Spenborough Forget-me-not Fund.
- Jasper Stephenson, JP. For services to agriculture in the County of Durham.
- Captain Robert William Smith-Stewart, Secretary, Eastern Area, British Legion.
- Geoffrey Edwin Surl, Higher Executive Officer, Ministry of Civil Aviation.
- Norman Sutherland, Chairman, Aberdeen Tomato Distribution Association.
- James Sutton. For services to poultry breeding in Lancashire.
- John Sweeney, Manager, Sheffield (Central) Local Office, Ministry of National Insurance.
- Thomas Ewart Sweet, JP, Regional Secretary, National Federation of Building Trade Operatives, Member of the Welsh Board for Industry.
- Florence Clare Sykes, lately Chief Nursing Officer, Ministry of Supply.
- Mabel Alloway Symonds, County Organiser, Bedfordshire, Women's Voluntary Services.
- Frederick John Edward Taylor, Staff Officer, Board of Customs and Excise.
- Lucy Maud Taylor. For charitable and welfare services in Marple and district, Cheshire.
- Peggy Nora Taylor, Chief Superintendent of Typists (Regions), Ministry of Works.
- Marjorie Muriel Sinclair Wynne-Thomas. For public services in North Wales.
- Henry William Thompson, PhD, Head of the Medicinal Process Section, Dyestuffs Division, Imperial Chemical Industries Ltd.
- Ethelwyn Mary Tindall, Matron, City of London Maternity Hospital.
- Reginald Charles Treadgold, FRICS, Honorary Secretary, Association of Drainage Authorities.
- Margaret Turner, Higher Executive Officer, Home Office.
- Howard Tutt, Organising Secretary, Bristol and South West Area, National Union of Vehicle Builders.
- Observer Lieutenant William Twiss, Group Officer, North Western Area, Royal Observer Corps.
- Joseph Edward Tyzack, Chief Actuary, West Midland Savings Bank.
- May Unwin, Headmistress, Norton County Girls' School, East Yorkshire.
- Charles Augustus Cokayne Vecqueray, AMIME, Chairman of Committee, No. 1084 (Market Harborough) Squadron, Air Training Corps.
- Alfred Wade, Chief Sanitary Inspector, City of Nottingham.
- Tom Herbert Wakefield, District Controller, Railway Executive, London Midland Region.
- Herbert John Wakeling, Senior Assistant, Ministry of Civil Aviation.
- William John Wakeling, Executive Officer, Office of HM Procurator General and Treasury Solicitor.
- Ernest Waldron, AMIEE, Electrical Engineer, Admiralty.
- Caleb Leslie Walker, Canteen Manager, Royal Ordnance Factory, Woolwich.
- Harold Arthur Walker, District Superintendent, Country Buses and Coaches, London Transport Executive.
- Richard Harvey Wallis, Chief Preventive Officer, Board of Customs and Excise.
- Alfred Ernest Ward, Manager, Import Department, British Iron and Steel Corporation.
- Harry Watson, Divisional Officer, Forestry Commission.
- John Alan Watt, Assistant Manager (Shipyard), Harland & Wolff Ltd., Belfast.
- Marjorie Adela Gibson Watt, JP, Chairman, Labour Sub-Committee, Radnor Agricultural Executive Committee.
- John William Wearmouth, JP, Vice-Chairman, Sunderland and District Employment Committee.
- Aileen Crawford Wells, County Director, Bedfordshire Branch, British Red Cross Society.
- Sidney George Wells, Superintendent, Metropolitan Police Force.
- Ada Mary Weymark, Member, Tottenham Local Employment Committee.
- Thomas Charles Edward Wheel, Chairman, Wiltshire District Committee, South Western Regional Board for Industry.
- Bryan Thomas George Wheeler, Officer, London Port, Board of Customs and Excise.
- Alfred Harold Whiteley, Chairman of Committee, No. 384 (Mansfield) Squadron, Air Training Corps.
- Harold Wilcoxon, MC, Senior Area Officer, Liverpool, National Assistance Board.
- Harold Williams, Accountant, Regional Finance Office, Manchester, Ministry of Labour and National Service.
- Ruth Holland Williams, Junior Commander, Auxiliary Territorial Service, Army Welfare Officer, Preston, Lancashire.
- Richard John Willis, Apparatus Works Engineer, Siemens Bros. & Co. Ltd.
- Ernest William Wills, Assistant Financial Adviser, British Army of the Rhine.
- Ernest Wolsey, AMIMechE, Engineer, Grade I, Ministry of Supply.
- Fred Huntly Woodcock, Port Fish Distribution Officer, Grimsby, Ministry of Food.
- Peter Woodward, Senior Plant Manager, Imperial Chemical Industries Ltd.
- Edward Albert Wright, Inspector of Taxes, Board of Inland Revenue.
- Richard Edward Wright, Base Maintenance Superintendent, London Airport, British South American Airways Corporation.
- Oswald Harry Young, Senior Staff Officer, Admiralty.
- Olga Konstantinovna Abbott, Physician, Ethiopian Vice Ministry of Health, Addis Ababa.
- Charles Wilfred Arning, Second Secretary (Commercial) at His Majesty's Embassy at Santiago.
- Edward Clarence Bateman, until recently His Majesty's Vice-Consul at Genoa.
- William Allen Campbell, British subject resident in Cuba.
- Lloyd Stanley Carrington, British West Indian subject resident in Panama.
- Louis Caruana, lately British Vice-Consul at Sousse.
- Arthur Stanley Dean, His Majesty's Consul at Valencia.
- Anne Eugenie Ellis, British subject resident in Egypt.
- Nicholas Evangelides, British Vice-Consul at Piraeus.
- Hugo Fleischmann, His Majesty's Consul at Quezaltenango.
- Guy Chandos Harcourt, until recently Acting British Consul at Salonica.
- Herbert Paton Johnson, Accountant at His Majesty's Embassy at Lima.
- Edith Maunder, British subject resident in Peru.
- Ernest Frederick Moore, His Majesty's Consul at Sucre.
- William Edward Burdett Newenham, British Vice-Consul at Rotterdam.
- Donald O'Leary, British Vice-Consul at Haifa.
- Eva Dorna Gwendollan Pritchard, Registrar at His Majesty's Consulate-General at Boston.
- Clothilde Sant, British subject resident in Egypt.
- Mary Dundas Strachan, Executive Officer at His Majesty's Consulate-General at Detroit.
- Elizabeth Tanburn, MSc, FRSS, Statistician, Office of the Commissioner-General for His Majesty's Government in the United Kingdom in South-East Asia.
- Henry Walter Taylor, Workshops Superintendent, Mechanical Transport Department, Sudan Government.
- William James Thompson, formerly British Vice-Consul at Halden.
- Thomas John Victor Ferid Tucker, Administrative Assistant in the Information Department of His Majesty's Embassy in Ankara.
- Charles Wellesley Welman, British subject resident in Switzerland.
- George Ross Wilson, Deputy Assistant Civil Secretary, Sudan Government.
- George Wade Wilson, Cypher Officer at His Majesty's Consulate-General at Jerusalem.
- Thomas Herbert Cooke, Local Secretary to Beit Trust, Southern Rhodesia.
- James Stewart Crummey, Senior Superintendent, Department of Public Works, Newfoundland.
- Robert Day. For valuable services in Department of Education, Southern Rhodesia.
- Mollie Priscova Dingle. For long and devoted service as a Public School and Kindergarten teacher, Newfoundland.
- Charles Joseph Ellis. For long and efficient service to the Newfoundland Patriotic Association.
- Lilian Kate Freeborn, formerly Sister Tutor at Salisbury Hospital, Southern Rhodesia.
- Hedley Pierce Fudge, Trade Union Organiser and Member of Newfoundland Woods Labour Board.
- Nathanial Alcock Gibbon, Under-Secretary, Department of Public Health, Southern Rhodesia.
- Newman Wellington Gillingham, Secretary, Newfoundland Woods Labour Board.
- Leslie Owen Hildyard. For services in connexion with transport problems, State of Tasmania.
- Stanley Arthur James, Mayor of Remark, State of South Australia.
- Frederick Victor Parks. For long and devoted service as Honorary Commissioner in the Boy Scout Movement in Southern Rhodesia.
- Wilfred Douglas Pierson. For valuable services to Red Cross and Comforts Fund, Launceston, State of Tasmania.
- Muriel Rosin. For voluntary service in connection with Censorship duties in Southern Rhodesia during the War.
- John Reynolds Stebbing, Assistant District Officer, Swaziland.
- William Charles Winsor. For services to the Sealing industry, Newfoundland.
- William Joseph Woodford. For social welfare services over many years as Executive Member of the Great War Veteran's Association, Newfoundland.
- The Reverend Henry Hugh Morley Wright. For services to the African Boy Scout Movement, Southern Rhodesia.
- Thomas Rajanayagam Abraham, Headmaster, Batu Road School, Kuala Lumpur, Federation of Malaya.
- Hulaimot Mobolaji Agbaje, Headmistress, Ansar-Ud-Deen School, Alakoro, Lagos, Nigeria.
- David Moor Allen, Colonial Administrative Service, District Commissioner, Gold Coast.
- David William Amos, Senior Mosquito Inspector, Fiji.
- Edith Sophia Andrews, Principal, St. Mary's Church of England School, Kuching, Sarawak.
- Thomas Attenborough, Acting Superintendent of the Leper Camp, Sarawak, and President of the Sarawak Government Junior Service Association.
- William Eric Bassett, Agricultural Superintendent, Montserrat, Leeward Islands.
- Matilde Antoinette Buxton, Headmistress, Plainfields School, Singapore.
- Charles Herbert Carne, Rehabilitation Officer, Fiji.
- John Charles Cater, Colonial Forest Service, Deputy Conservator, of Forests, Trinidad.
- Chan Joo Chua, Office Assistant to the Attorney General, Singapore.
- Inn Kiong Cheah, Chairman of the Penang YWCA, Federation of Malaya.
- Albert Edward Cheal, Colonial Postal Service, Engineer, Posts and Telegraphs Department, Nigeria.
- Maurice Arthur Collings, Principal Auditor, Gibraltar; until recently Auditor, Central Office, Colonial Audit Service.
- Reverend Brother Michael Canice Collins, Headmaster, St. Mary's College, Castries, St. Lucia, Windward Islands.
- Newton William Corker, Head Teacher, Pilling School, St. Helena.
- Walter Fleming Courrs, Colonial Administrative Service, District Commissioner, Fort Hall, Kenya.
- Ronald Albert Derrick, AMIStructE, Supervisor of Technical Services and Principal, Suva Technical School, Fiji.
- Hettiaratchige Anthony de Silva, Secretary, Rural Board, Singapore.
- Percy Archibald Charteris Douglas, Temporary Surveyor, Forest Department, Cyprus.
- Nekibzade Fadil, Mayor of Lefka, Cyprus.
- Mercy Kwaley Ffoulkes-Crabbe, Headmistress, Government Girls' School, Cape Coast, Gold Coast.
- Joseph Galea, MD, Medical Officer of Health, Malta.
- James Olva Georges, Senior Unofficial Member of the Executive Council of the Virgin Islands and Member of the General Legislative Council of the Leeward Islands.
- The Reverend Francis Godson, Chairman of the Old Age Pensions Claims Committee for the Parish of St. Michael, Barbados.
- Anna Itala Chermont Goupille, Social Worker with the Red Cross and Child Welfare, Mauritius.
- Darbar Singh Gundara, Assistant Forester, Grade I, Kenya.
- Harry Charles Warwick Guy, Livestock Improvement Officer, Veterinary Department, Kenya.
- The Reverend John Truman Navaratham Handy, Deputy Secretary for Social Welfare, Singapore.
- Ho Kwai Fong, Executive Officer, Grade II, Public Works Department, Hong Kong.
- Gladys Ruby Ibbs, Colonial Nursing Service, Matron, Grade I, Tanganyika.
- Captain Mohamedkhan Dawoodkhan Jafferkhan, Commanding Officer, HHS Al Said, Zanzibar.
- Sister Jarlath, Roman Catholic Mission. For services in connection with the Badagri Dispensary and Maternity Centre, Nigeria.
- The Reverend Edward Armon Jones, Chairman and General Superintendent of the Methodist Church in Jamaica.
- Lo Tak Cheong, Registry Clerk, Class I, Marine Department, Hong Kong.
- John Andrew Mahoney, Chairman of the Development Council, Gambia.
- John George Marcellos, Dental Officer, Medical Department, Cyprus.
- William Cuthbertus Mensah, Collector of Customs and Excise, Gold Coast.
- Helen Isabel Monson, Acting British Council Representative, Gold Coast.
- Roderick O'Connor, Acting Chief Valuer, Trinidad.
- Comfort Lamley Peregrino-Aryee, Senior Supervisor, Telephone Exchange, Accra, Gold Coast.
- Frederic George Wilson Potter, Senior Storekeeper, Nigerian Railways.
- Louis Renaud Lucien Pouzet, Master, Royal College, Mauritius.
- Ram Rakha, Transport Officer, Public Works Department, Kenya.
- Daulat Ram, Headmaster, Kampala Indian Primary School, Uganda.
- Khan Sahib Mohammed Khan Rangbaz Khan, Chief Inspector of Armed Police, Aden.
- Henry Rangeley, Labour Officer (part-time), Northern Rhodesia.
- Joseph Louis Marcel Rault, lately Registrar of Friendly Societies, Mauritius.
- Stephen Fowler Saunders, TD, Laboratory Technician, Nigeria.
- Denton Willoughby Layers, Superintendent Mechanic, Department of Highways and Transport, and Engineer in charge of Government Watercraft, Barbados.
- Aubrey Sedgwick, First Officer, Royal Marine Steamer Fitzroy, Falkland Islands.
- William Robinson Shann, AMIMechE, Engineering Inspector, Crown Agents for the Colonies.
- Alfred Alexander Short, Collector of Customs, Sierra Leone.
- Gorbex Singh, Teacher, Class I, Education Department, Federation of Malaya.
- Thambimuthu Sivapragasam, Senior Urban Co-operative Officer, Federation of Malaya.
- Elizabeth Firth Stead, Nursing Sister and Midwife, Methodist Mission Medical Service, Nigeria.
- Thomas Stenning, Bandmaster, Gold Coast Police.
- Charles Leonard Swaby, Assistant Secretary, Jamaica.
- Lenora Thomson, Stenographer, Tanganyika.
- Fitz-Herbert Waithe, Sanitary Inspector, Special Grade, Trinidad.
- Margaret Webb, Assistant Secretary, Women and Girls' Section, Department of Social Welfare, Singapore.
- Charles Mathew Newton White, Colonial Administrative Service, District Officer, Northern Rhodesia.
- Reginald Evans Wilbraham, Senior Agricultural Assistant, Nyasaland.
- The Venerable Victor Barry Wynburne, Archdeacon of the Seychelles.

Honorary Members

- Charles Udor Minto, Warden of The Colonial Office Seamen's Hostel, North Shields.
- Mohamed Ali bin Taib, Assistant Official Assignee, Federation of Malaya.
- Eyo Eyo Esua, General Secretary of the Nigerian Union of Teachers, Nigeria.
- Lionel Randolph Potts-Johnson, Member for Port Harcourt in the Eastern House of Assembly, Nigeria.
- Fanny Susan Latunde. For Public Services in Nigeria.
- Edward Sulimani Kalegesa, Ex-Saza Chief, Ruzhumbura, Kigezi District, Uganda.
- Andrea Olal, Ex-County Chief, Omoro County, Acholi District, Uganda.

=== Order of the Companions of Honour (CH) ===
- Lord (Edward Christian) David Gascoyne-Cecil, Writer. Goldsmith Professor of English Literature, University of Oxford.
- Arthur Deakin, CBE, General Secretary, Transport and General Workers' Union.

=== British Empire Medal (BEM) ===
Military Division

Royal Navy

- Colour Sergeant (Acting Staff Sergeant) James Baines, Ply.X 920, Royal Marines.
- Chief Airman Thomas John Beere, L/FX 76548.
- Chief Petty Officer Writer (Pensioner) Charles Howard Bishop, P/MX 53170.
- Sick Berth Chief Petty Officer Albert Bowers, C/MX 47257.
- Chief Petty Officer Telegraphist Edward William Arthur Collins, D/JX 138584.
- Regimental Sergeant-Major Thomas Henry East, DSM, CH.X 454, Royal Marines.
- Temporary Petty Officer Cook (S) Raymond Charles Fry, DSM, P/MX 52380.
- Colour Sergeant William James Goddard, CH.X 4630, Royal Marines.
- Chief Yeoman of Signals (Temporary) Frank Edward Hall, C/JX 139158.
- Chief Shipwright Artificer William George Hearnden, C/MX 48750.
- Chief Petty Officer Stoker Mechanic William Hill, DSM, D/KX 78473.
- Chief Engine Room Artificer Horace Henry Holland, DSM, P/MX 52950.
- Acting Chief Radio Electrician (Air) (W) William Thomas Jinks, L/FX 114483.
- Chief Petty Officer (Air A.M. (A)) Frank Eric Johnson, L/FX 80033.
- Chief Aircraft Officer (now Acting Warrant Aircraft Officer) Sydney Jones, L/FX 76092.
- Marine Peter Litherland, CH.X. 4329, Royal Marines.
- Petty Officer Telegraphist James Maddock, P/JX 126882.
- Able Seaman William Edward Mdddleton, D/JX 132761.
- Leading Telegraphist George Archibald Newitt, DSM, C/J 111126.
- Chief Wren Cook (O) Eleanor Parke, 15256, Women's Royal Naval Service.
- Master at Arms Alfred William Pearce, P/MX 58551.
- Chief Shipwright Artificer Norman William George Pike, D/MX 46227.
- Chief Petty Officer (Pensioner) Albert Jesse Robinson, D/J 8651.
- Chief Petty Officer Lionel William Charles Saysell, P/JX 125981.
- Chief Wren Daisy Kathleen Southey, 14819, Women's Royal Naval Service.
- Acting Chief Petty Officer Steward Ernest Taliana, E/L 15053.
- Master-at-Arms Victor Edward Charles Terry, C/MX 59097.
- Chief Petty Officer Herbert Alfred Whitney, P/J 111637.
- Chief Petty Officer Stoker Mechanic Percy Luther Winter, DSM, C/KX 77911.
- Air Artificer James Frederick Yeatman, L/FX 75288.

Army

- No. 7897332 Warrant Officer Class II (Squadron Quartermaster-Sergeant) (acting) Eric Adams, 16th/5th Lancers, Royal Armoured Corps.
- No. 2715298 Guardsman John Copeland Blakley, Irish Guards.
- No. 15135 Warrant Officer Class I (Regimental Sergeant Major) (acting)Joe Wallace Blincow, Grenadier Guards.
- No. 14863104 Sergeant (acting) Arthur Kenneth Alfred Blyth, Corps of Royal Engineers.
- No. S/14077179 Warrant Officer Class II (Staff Quartermaster-Sergeant) (acting) James McNaughton Brodie, Royal Army Service Corps.
- No. 5567001 Sergeant Stanley Charles Brown, Army Catering Corps.
- No. 14109930 Corporal (acting) Richard Kenneth Burbidge, Royal Corps of Signals.
- No. E.C.7658 Warrant Officer Class II (Company Sergeant-Major) (acting) Moses Chingane, High Commission Territories Corps.
- No. 1877394 Warrant Officer Class II (Company-Sergeant-Major) (acting) Geoffrey Harry Collins, Corps of Royal Engineers.
- No. W/122786 Sergeant Elizabeth Phoebe Crouch, Auxiliary Territorial Service.
- No. E.C.45002 Sergeant Amos Maxwell Dambe, High Commission Territories Corps.
- No. T/911897 Sergeant Richard Harry Dandie, Royal Army Service Corps.
- No. C.A./2045 Staff-Sergeant Thomas Joseph De Souza, The King's African Rifles.
- No. 19065425 Sergeant (acting) Alfred Peter Dewing, Intelligence Corps.
- No. W/112593 Sergeant Millicent Kathleen Fielding, Auxiliary Territorial Service.
- No. W/312614 Lance-Corporal (acting) Ellen Fitzpatrick, Auxiliary Territorial Service.
- No. W/24914 Staff-Sergeant Vera Mary Fox, Auxiliary Territorial Service.
- No. 14441606 Corporal Frederick Joseph Garner, Corps of Royal Military Police.
- No. 847176 Sergeant Stanley Alexander Gibbs, Royal Regiment of Artillery.
- No. 7335392 Sergeant Harold Hardman, Corps of Royal Engineers.
- No. W/196705 Staff-Sergeant (acting) Eileen Hickey, Auxiliary Territorial Service.
- No. W/22738 Sergeant Phyllis Elizabeth Hockley, Auxiliary Territorial Service.
- No. 151547 Sergeant Dolores Marguerite Holmes, Voluntary Aid Detachment.
- No. 3850949 Corporal Herbert Kempster, The Loyal Regiment (North Lancashire).
- No. S/14049004 Staff-Sergeant Peter Mitchell Knowles, Royal Army Service Corps.
- No. W/191568 Corporal Jessie Ann Mackenzie, Auxiliary Territorial Service.
- No. AS/11156 Staff-Sergeant Limo Mahjong, High Commission Territories Corps.
- No. 2751655 Colour-Sergeant William McKenzie, The Black Watch (Royal Highland Regiment).
- No. 21019553 Warrant Officer Class II (acting) Norman James Morgan, Royal Electrical and Mechanical Engineers.
- No. E.C.9799 Sergeant (acting) Mmemo Odubehile, High Commission Territories Corps.
- No. 3062624 Colour-Sergeant Thomas Pennycook, The Royal Scots (The Royal Regiment).
- No. 3855872 Sergeant Michael Pledge, Royal Army Ordnance Corps.
- No. 14499625 Sergeant (acting) Eric Procter, Corps of Royal Engineers.
- No. 21131181 Rifleman Purna Sing Gurung, The Brigade of Gurkhas.
- No. 856261 Staff-Sergeant Ronald Ernest Renton, Royal Electrical and Mechanical Engineers.
- No. 1026601 Sergeant William Russell, Royal Regiment of Artillery.
- No. 2647427 Sergeant James George Slip, Coldstream Guards.
- No. W/35028 Sergeant Agnes Eleanor Storey, Auxiliary Territorial Service.
- No. 2881341 Sergeant Henry Alexander Tavendale, The Gordon Highlanders.
- No. 2606601 Sergeant Albert Thomas Taylor, Grenadier Guards.
- No. T/14422842 Warrant Officer Class II (Company-Sergeant-Major) (acting) Albert Frederick Wills, Royal Army Service Corps.
- No. 810139 Sergeant John Wylie, Royal Artillery, Territorial Army.
- No. E.C.4099 Sergeant Johannes Zuze, High Commission Territories Corps.

Royal Air Force

- 561432 Flight Sergeant Cyril George Argent.
- 633230 Flight Sergeant Arthur James Coutts.
- 521884 Flight Sergeant John Edward Frost.
- 563107 Flight Sergeant William Edward Fuggle.
- 563171 Flight Sergeant Arthur Ernest Charles Hellyer.
- 538049 Flight Sergeant John Arthur Marsh.
- 352898 Flight Sergeant George Charles Mullings.
- 564975 Flight Sergeant William Walter Phillips.
- 567745 Flight Sergeant Jack Rogers.
- 530393 Flight Sergeant Joseph Lawrence Stringfellow.
- 561229 Flight Sergeant Thomas William Tyler.
- 563296 Flight Sergeant Alex Amunsden Wiseman.
- 569523 Sergeant David John Abercromby.
- 569568 Sergeant Winsor Alan Balchin.
- 1865599 Sergeant Harry William Cawte.
- 2685502 Sergeant Robert Edward Gibson, Royal Auxiliary Air Force.
- 521682 Sergeant Alan Cecil Hazlitt.
- 648042 Sergeant Richard McDermott.
- 504847 Sergeant Leonard Stanley Pullen.
- 621606 Sergeant Herbert John George Tailford.
- 568539 Sergeant John Thompson.
- 3086461 Corporal William Robert Baker, Royal Air Force Volunteer Reserve.
- 1880502 Corporal Peter Wilfred Batty.
- 1570570 Corporal Robert Horne.
- 552249 Corporal John Stoddart Drummond Robb.
- 932100 Leading Aircraftman Albert Edward Powley.
- 2074779 Sergeant Edna Maude Burns, Women's Auxiliary Air Force.
- 2021147 Sergeant Rose Margaret Lehane, Women's Auxiliary Air Force.
- 435596 Sergeant Margaret Troy, Women's Auxiliary Air Force.
- 2035879 Corporal Alison Margaret Fisher, Women's Auxiliary Air Force.

Civil Division

United Kingdom

- Ernest Adams, Leading Erector, Stanton Ironworks Co. Ltd. (Ilkeston, Derbyshire).
- Lucy Addyman, Tuber, Park Mill (Royton) Ltd. (Royton, Lancashire).
- Joan Allan, Canteen Manageress, Royal Ordnance Factory, Birtley. (Low Fell, Co. Durham).
- Thomas Allen, Chargehand Moulder, Manganese Bronze & Brass Co. Ltd., Birkenhead. (Wallasey, Cheshire).
- Frederick Andrews, Able Seaman, SS Tacoma City, Sir William Reardon Smith & Sons Ltd. (Truro, Cornwall).
- Winifred Annikin, Manageress, NAAFI Social Club, Maintenance Unit, RAF Stafford.
- Ivy Kate Bacon, Factory Worker, Carter & Co. Ltd. (Poole).
- Norman Bailey, Fitter, No. 2 Maintenance Unit, RAF Broadheath, Altrincham.
- George Robert Baldwin, Chief Paper-keeper, Foreign Office.
- Grace Elizabeth Rose Barrett, Supervisor of Sorting Assistants, Savings Department, General Post Office. (Harrogate).
- Edward Victor Beechey, Principal Foreman, No. 27 Maintenance Unit, RAF Shawbury, Shrewsbury.
- Reginald Edwin Bence, Slaughterhouse Manager, Ministry of Food, Plymouth.
- Lawrence Benson, Auxiliary Plant Attendant, Darlington Power Station, British Electricity Authority. (Darlington).
- Andrew Borland, Chief Store Officer, HM Prison Greenock.
- Ralph Douglas Boyce, Acting Chief Inspector, War Department Constabulary, Donnington.
- Charles Brannan, Head Lampman, Newtown Colliery, National Coal Board, North Western Division. (Swinton, Lancashire).
- Robert Bridge, Instructor, Bank Hall Colliery, National Coal Board, North Western Division. (Burnley).
- Ethel Bridle, Assistant Supervisor, Class I (Telephones), General Post Office, Andover, Hants.
- William Ernshaw Brook, Foreman, Hopkinsons Ltd. (Huddersfield).
- Sylvina Brown, Member, Scottish Women's Land Army, Arbroath.
- William Norman Bruce, Lieutenant, Edinburgh City Police Force.
- William Corstorphine Brydie, Chargeman of Shipwrights, HM Dockyard, Devonport.
- Edward John Bullock, Joiner, Parnall & Sons Ltd. (Bristol).
- Arthur Bunting, Chargeman Coal Filler, "A" Winning Colliery, National Coal Board, East Midlands Division. (South Normanton, Derbyshire).
- Winifred Burkitt, Centre Organiser, Women's Voluntary Services, Wellingborough.
- John Burnell, Deputy, Ackton Hall Colliery, National Coal Board, North Eastern Division. (Featherstone, Yorkshire).
- Thomas Burton, Turbine Driver, South West Scotland Division, British Electricity Authority. (Glasgow).
- Robert Sydney Buxton, Assistant Foreman Photoprinter, Engineering Department, General Post Office. (Tolworth, Surrey).
- Ernest Chamberlain, Office Keeper and Superintendent of Messengers, Prime Minister's Office.
- Frederick Chapman, Inspector of Mechanics, Newport, Railway Executive, Western Region. (Llantarnam, Monmouthshire).
- Helen Dickinson-Chetham, Centre Organiser, Women's Voluntary Services, Rickmansworth.
- Harry John William Clare, Turner, Vickers-Armstrongs Ltd. (Dartford, Kent).
- Bertram Watson Clark, Coastguardman, HM Coastguard, Arbroath.
- Elizabeth Clarke, Frame Tenter, Great Lever Spinning Company. (Bolton).
- Ethel Ann Clarke, Collector, National Savings Groups, Finsbury. (Highbury, N.5).
- William Clayphan, Works Foreman, Trent Catchment Board. (Owston Ferry, Doncaster).
- George Walter Clissold, Craftsman, Imperial War Museum. (Southwark, S.E.1).
- Walter Corner, Stone Worker, Church Gresley Colliery, National Coal Board, East Midlands Division. (Burton-on-Trent).
- Herbert James Cox, Foreman, Ministry of Supply Factory, Springfields. (Salwick, Preston).
- Elise Crothers, Centre Organiser, Women's Voluntary Services, Penryn Borough.
- Joseph Dale, Ticket Collector, Southport, Railway Executive, London Midland Region. (Southport).
- Gertrude Elizabeth Danby, JP, Centre Organiser, Women's Voluntary Services, Seaford.
- George Alfred Davies, Deputy Inspector of Custody Services, Ministry of Works.
- Robert Davison, Flanger, Robert Stephenson and Hawthorns Ltd. (Darlington).
- Alfred Percy Ducker, Telephone Mechanic, General Post Office, Birmingham.
- Sarah Lilian Duckering, Assistant Supervisor (Telegraphs), Head Post Office, Grantham.
- Edgar John Dunbar Dwyer, Senior Messenger, Office of the Chancellor of the Exchequer.
- Thomas Eccles, Sub-Postmaster, Burnden Town Sub-Post Office, Bolton.
- John William Etherington, Ship Frame Erector, Cook, Welton & Gemmell Ltd. (Beverley, Yorkshire).
- Claire Gladys Mary Evans, Deputy Centre Organiser, Women's Voluntary Services, Camberwell.
- George Watson Ewen, Postman, Dundee.
- Tom Farmer, Overman, Brodsworth Main Colliery, National Coal Board, North Eastern Division. (Adwick-le-Street, Doncaster).
- John Nicholson Fisher, Glasshouse Manager, George Davidson & Co. Ltd. (Gateshead-on-Tyne).
- Henry Ernest Frake, Foreman, Royal Ordnance Factory, Nottingham. (West Bridgford).
- Edith Annie Gallagher, Assistant for Reception and Information, Women's Voluntary Services Headquarters, London. (Kensington, W.8).
- Emily Godfrey, Yard Examiner, James Stott Ltd. (Oldham).
- William James Goodman, Acting Inspector of Engine Fitters, Royal Naval Artificers Training Establishment, Torpoint, Cornwall.
- Joseph Gray, Head Storekeeper, Wallsend Slipway & Engineering Company Ltd. (Wallsend-on-Tyne).
- Walter Green, Services Engineer, Dunlop Rubber Co. Ltd. (Liverpool).
- Hubert Ernest Grist, Winding Engineman, Norton Hill Colliery, National Coal Board, South Western Division. (Midsomer Norton, Bath).
- Herbert J. Guest, Agricultural Worker, Ottery St. Mary, Devonshire.
- Bernard George Hales, JP, Station Master, Willesden Green, London Transport Executive. (North Harrow).
- Frank Thomas Hall, Operative, 1st Class, Admiralty Compass Observatory, Ditton Park, Slough.
- Frederick James Harris, Permanent Way Inspector, Baling, Railway Executive, Western Region. (West Baling, W.13).
- Sidney Harris, Works Foreman, John Wisden & Co. Ltd. (Tonbridge, Kent).
- Harold Alfred George Harrison, Leader, Horley (Commando) National Savings Canvassing Team. (Smallfields, Surrey).
- William Hart, Storeholder, Ministry of Supply Storage Depot, Brinscall, Lancashire.
- Frederick William Haynes, Works Electrician, Docker Brothers, Nottingham. (Birmingham).
- James Heyton, Master Drifter, Risehow Colliery, National Coal Board, Northern Division. (Maryport, Cumberland).
- Harvey Victor Hickman, Tool Turner, Hoffman Manufacturing Co. Ltd. (Chelmsford, Essex).
- George Higgs, Head Roll Turner and Designer, London Works (Barlows) Ltd. (Birmingham).
- Eva Holliday, Member, Women's Land Army, Bishop Auckland.
- John Chadwick Howard, Slinger, Kendall & Gent Ltd. (Manchester).
- William Hughes, Colliery Repairer, Great Mountain No. 1 Colliery, National Coal Board, South Western Division. (Carway, Kidwelly).
- John Husband, Planer, William Beardmore & Company Ltd. (Glasgow, E.2).
- Alice James, Office Cleaner and Mail Woman, Ty Trist Colliery, National Coal Board, South Western Division. (Nantybwch, Tredegar).
- Dorothy Kathleen Jay, Member, Women's Land Army, Liss, Hampshire. (Wolverhampton).
- Vincent Jenkinson, Voluntary Welfare Worker, City of London Army Cadet Camps. (Clapton, E.5).
- Charles Ernest Johnson, Relief Signalman, Darlington, Railway Executive, North Eastern Region. (West Hartlepool).
- Henry Jones, Agricultural Worker, Carmarthen.
- Lewis Jones, Chargehand Rigger, Charles Hill & Sons Ltd. (Bristol).
- Eyleen McKinley Kennedy, Organiser and Collector, National Savings Group, Portrush, Co. Antrim.
- John Frederick Kiernan, Supervisor (M) Higher Grade, London Telecommunications Region, General Post Office. (Herne, Hill, S.E.24).
- Lily Kingscott, Street Collector, National Savings Group, Birmingham.
- Vincent Everett Kirkham Lambert, Acting Assistant Inspecting Officer, Naval Store Department, Admiralty.
- Leslie William Laws, Fitter and Erector, Davey, Paxman & Co. Ltd. (Colchester).
- William Leach, Leading Furnace Hand, Talbot-Stead Tube Co. Ltd. (Walsall).
- Eva Helen Lewis, Member, Women's Land Army, Sandown, Isle of Wight.
- James Lewthwaite, Process Worker, Royal Ordnance Factory, Drigg. (Egremont, Cumberland).
- Anne Lindon, Collector, National Savings Group, Blandford, Dorset.
- Zipporah Eliza Lloyd, Polisher, Richard Thomas and Baldwins Ltd. (Brierley Hill, Staffs).
- Helen Jane Lobban, Net Mender, Buckie. For services to the Herring Fishing Industry.
- Albert Edward Lombard, Manager of Priorities Department, Fish Merchants' Association, Grimsby.
- Herbert Long, Chief Tool Designer, R. & J. Beck Ltd. (Hendon, N.W.9).
- George Lumsden, Foreman, Cabinet Factory, Co-operative Wholesale Society Ltd. (Gateshead-on-Tyne).
- Michael Lynch, Packer, Supplies Department, General Post Office. (Hampstead, N.W.3).
- Richard McDonald, Greaser, MV Pinzon, MacAndrews & Co. Ltd. (Liverpool).
- William Forster Macdonald, JP, Battery Fitter, West Ham Generating Station, British Electricity Authority. (Plaistow, E.13).
- William Albert McMillin, Office Keeper, Home Office.
- Julia Maguire, Saucer Maker, Barratt's of Staffordshire Ltd. (Stoke-on-Trent).
- Kannan Mannan, Leading Measurer and Recorder, HM Dockyard, Singapore.
- James Stanley Marks, Inspector (Engineering), General Post Office, Cardiff.
- Frederick Martin, Head Gardener, Imperial War Graves Commission, France.
- Frederick John Maton, Police Inspector, Swansea Docks, Railway Executive, Western Region. (Swansea).
- Charles Henry Maycock, Station Officer, Leicestershire Fire Brigade. (Market Harborough).
- William Henry Maycock, Postman, Sheffield.
- Samuel Megraw, JP, Plater, Harland & Wolff Ltd. (Belfast).
- William Mew, Able Seaman, MV Britannic, Cunard White Star Ltd. (Liverpool).
- Frederick William Middleton, Sub-Postmaster, Mulbarton, Norwich.
- Alexander Mills, Section Leader, Central Area Fire Brigade, Stirling.
- Leslie Anderson Moncrieff, Experimental Officer, Telecommunications Research Establishment, Ministry of Supply, Malvern.
- Mary Ann Jean Morrison, Organiser, Soldiers' Home, Christchurch. (Bournemouth).
- Louis John Aubrey Murrell, Chief, Passenger Rolling Stock Section, Waterloo, Railway Executive, Southern Region. (Dorking, Surrey).
- Archibald Neilson, Training Supervisor, Lady Victoria Colliery, National Coal Board, Scottish Division. (Newtongrange, Midlothian).
- Albert Nickles, Inspector (Postal), General Post Office, Hastings.
- Arthur William Nield, Sergeant, Royal Ulster Constabulary. (Belfast).
- Arthur Nixon, Foreman, Guest Keen & Nettlefolds Ltd. (Wednesbury, Staffs).
- Edith Lizzie Nobles, Supervisor (F), Telephones, General Post Office, Northampton.
- Samuel Noden, Rock Salt Miner, Imperial Chemical Industries Ltd. (Middlewich, Cheshire).
- William Oliver, Inspector (Engineering), Malone Telephone Exchange, Belfast.
- Robert Owen, Slatemaker, Penrhyn Quarry. (Rhiwlas, Bangor).
- Albert Arthur Pammenter, Manager, Admiralty Luncheon Club, Bath. (Chiswick, London).
- Ruth Parker, Centre Organiser, Women's Voluntary Services, Larne, Co. Antrim.
- Peter Paskell, Calenderman, B.X. Plastics Ltd. (Manningtree, Essex).
- Edmund James Payne, Conductor, Middle Row, London Transport Executive. (Kensal Rise, N.W.10).
- Annabel Pearson, Centre Organiser, Women's Voluntary Services, Bridgwater.
- Edward Pearson, Stoneman, Silksworth Colliery, National Coal Board, Northern Division. (New Silksworth, Sunderland).
- Frederick Pell, Outside Ganger, Bankside Power Station, British Electricity Authority. (Richmond, Surrey).
- Wilfred Pengelly, Volunteer in Charge, Auxiliary Watch & Life Saving Association, Portwringle, Cornwall.
- Arthur John George Phillips, Station Officer, HM Coastguard, Eastbourne.
- William Piercey, Agricultural Worker, Maw, Doncaster.
- Annie Plummer, Telephonist (F), Gerrard Telephone Exchange, London. (Maida Vale, W.9).
- William Thomas Prentice, Head Chef, Royal Military Academy Sandhurst.
- Elsie May Pritchard, lately Manageress, Carterton Egg Packing Station, Co-operative Wholesale Society, Oxon.
- Walter Harold Proctor, Foreman, John I. Thornycroft & Company Ltd. (Woolston, Southampton).
- Winifred Rainford, Honorary Organiser and Collector, National Savings Groups, Lancaster.
- Ramsaroop Rampeth, Senior Storeman, RAF Maintenance Base, Seletar.
- John Thomas Raper, Chargehand Maintenance Man, Eaglescliffe Chemical Company. (Eaglescliffe, Co. Durham).
- John Rathbone, Foreman, Hale & Hale (Tipton) Ltd. (Walsall).
- John James Rees, Process Worker, Plastics Division, Imperial Chemical Industries Ltd. (West Croydon, Surrey).
- Thomas Riley, Fireman, Coatbridge, Lanarkshire.
- Tom Clifford Riley, Glass-blower, Hailwood & Ackroyd Ltd. (Morley, Yorkshire).
- Clara Alice Maria Rolt, Assistant Superintendent (F), London Postal Region, General Post Office. (Lewisham, S.E.13).
- Nellie Kathleen Roome, Overseer (F), St. Peter's Street Branch Post Office, St. Albans, Herts.
- William Roger Ross, Senior Foreman, Cellulose Acetate Section, British Celanese Ltd. (Alvaston, Derby.)
- John Henry Russell, Chief Inspector, Birmingham City Police Force.
- Margaret Eleanor Grace Shingleton-Russell, Honorary Street Organiser and Collector, National Savings' Group, Long Eaton, Derbyshire.
- Peter Ryan, Dresser, Wm. Fergusson & Sons. (Dundee.)
- Elizabeth Scott, Village Representative, Women's Voluntary Services, Dunkeld and District.
- William Scurr, Administrative Assistant Instructor, Army Cadet Force, East Riding. (Beverley, Yorkshire.)
- Harry Selvey, Stallman, Cannock and Leacroft Unit Colliery, National Coal Board, West Midlands Division. (Bloxwich, Walsall.)
- Thomas William Sharpe, Turner and Fitter, Saunders-Roe Ltd. (East Cowes, Isle of Wight.)
- William Sheppard, Yard Master, Holloway, Railway Executive, Eastern Region. (Winchmore Hill, N.21.)
- Frances Mary Shorto, Centre Organiser, Women's Voluntary Services, Leamington Borough.
- Mary Small, Assistant Nurse, Peel Hospital, Clovenfords, Selkirkshire.
- Harry Smith, Foreman, Sawmill, Gimson & Slater Ltd. (Long Eaton, Nottingham).
- William Smith, Greaser and Fireman, MV British Valour, British Tanker Company Ltd. (Falmouth.)
- Harry Thomas Spratling, Collier, Tilmanstone Station Colliery, National Coal Board, South Eastern Division. (Dover.)
- Joseph Stead, Ganger, Docks & Inland Waterways Executive, Northern Division. (Doncaster.)
- Arthur John Taft, Office Keeper, HM Stationery Office.
- Ben Taylor. For services, to charities in Oldham and elsewhere.
- Henry Taylor, Coal Filler, Netherton Colliery, National Coal Board, Northern Division. (Netherton, Northumberland.)
- Stanley John Taylor, Chief Inspector (Postal), Head Post Office, Bournemouth.
- Yvonne Taylor, Member, Women's Land Army, Eyas, Sheffield. (Derby.)
- Frank Thompson, Foreman, Ingle Ltd. (Leeds.)
- John Thomson, Haulage Engineman, Isle of Canty Colliery, National Coal Board, Scottish Division. (Dunfermline.)
- Frank Edmund Tomlinson, Machine Room Overseer, Harrison & Sons Ltd. (Great Missenden, Buckinghamshire.)
- John Davidson Walker, Foreman Printer, Widnes, Lancashire.
- Cicely Wallers, Centre Organiser, Women's Voluntary Services, Woking.
- Frank Edward Ware, Instructor, No. 1 School of Technical Training, RAF Halton.
- Herbert Watson, Overman, Ormonde Colliery, National Coal Board, East Midlands Division. (Loscoe, Derbyshire.)
- Samuel William Watson, Weaver, Warner & Sons Ltd. (Braintree, Essex.)
- George Watts, Dock Supervisor, James Adam, Son & Co. Ltd. (Liverpool.)
- Henry Westover, Labourer, South Eastern Division, British Electricity Authority. (Maidstone.)
- Reginald George White, Operative Machinist, Castle Bros. (Furniture) Ltd. (High Wycombe.)
- Richard Willett, Foreman, Army School of Education, London.
- George Wilshaw, Underground Dataller, Norton Colliery, National Coal Board, West Midlands Division. (Baddeley Green, Stoke-on-Trent.)
- Alexander Wilson. For services to the Ardeer (Imperial Chemical Industries, Explosives) Savings Committee. (Saltcoats, Ayrshire.)
- Joshua Winn, Sub-Divisional Inspector, Metropolitan Police Force. (Thornton Heath, Surrey.)
- George Thomas Wisdom, Senior Chargehand, South Wales Electricity Board. (Porth, Glamorganshire.)
- William Thomas Wotton, Proof Assistant I, Armament Research Establishment, Ministry of Supply, Woolwich. (Belvedere.)
- Ernest Young, Superintendent of Works, Ministry of Works, Manchester.

Commonwealth of Australia

- Mary Agnes Melbourne. For patriotic and charitable work at Naracoorte, State of South Australia.
- Matilda Jane Verran. For charitable and public services in Port Lincoln, State of South Australia.

Colonial Empire

- William Percival Davies, lately Transport Officer, Staff of British Agent, Eastern Aden Protectorate.
- Miriam Batson, lately Charge Nurse, General Hospital, Barbados.
- Badri Nauth, Senior Magistrate's Clerk, British Guiana.
- Artin Nassibian, Chief Foreman, Public Works Department, Cyprus.
- Filipe Lewanavanue, Laboratory Assistant, Government Service, Fiji.
- Momodu N'Jie, Beachmaster, Marine Department, Public Utilities Department, Gambia.
- Braima Dagarti, Road Headman, Abra-Princes Road, Gold Coast.
- Arthur John Hughes, 2nd Division Clerk, Posts and Telegraphs Department, Gold Coast.
- John Day, Foreman, Class 1, East African Railways and Harbours, Nairobi, Kenya.
- Nazzareno Azzopardi, Foreman of Works, Malta.
- Lawrence Boffa, Sanitary Inspector, Malta.
- Isaac Fielding, Works Foreman, Bamenda Native Administration, Cameroons Province, Nigeria.
- Mathias Omale Kwanashte, First Class Nurse, Nigeria.
- Joseph Amalu, Member of Abaja Native Administration and Owa Native Court, Udi Division, Onitsha Province, Nigeria.
- Tedong anak Barieng, Member of the District and Divisional Advisory Councils, Sarawak.
- Auguste Gendron, Temporary Afforestation Officer, Seychelles.
- Chai Tzu Fong, Sub-Inspector of Police, Singapore.
- Francis Joseph John Tucker, 2nd Grade Clerk, Sierra Leone.
- Devappriya Amarasiri Siripala Nanayakkara, Senior Labour Supervisor, Township Authority, Dar es Salaam, Tanganyika.
- Thomas Petro Chisunga, Urban Sanitary Inspector, Tanganyika.

=== Royal Red Cross (RRC) ===
- Acting Matron Doris Ethel Johnston, ARRC, Queen Alexandra's Royal Naval Nursing Service.
- Matron (temporary) Ethel Prescott (206381), Queen Alexandra's Imperial Military Nursing Service.
- Matron (temporary) Phyllis Widger (206521), Queen Alexandra's Imperial Military Nursing Service.
- Acting Matron Roberta Mary Whyte, ARRC, (5049), Princess Mary's Royal Air Force Nursing Service.

==== Associate of the Royal Red Cross (ARRC) ====
- Acting Senior Sister Eleanor Gertrude Foster, Queen Alexandra's Royal Naval Nursing Service.
- Acting Senior Sister Joan Mary Woodgate, Queen Alexandra's Royal Naval Nursing Service.
- Acting Senior Sister Dorothy Mary Schilling (5098), Princess Mary's Royal Air Force Nursing Service.

=== Air Force Cross (AFC) ===
Royal Air Force

Squadron Leaders

- Neville Blake Freeman (82697).
- Ralph Edward Havercroft (114000).
- Alfred Stanley Knowles (43070).
- Harold Brownlow Martin, DSO, DFC, (68795).
- Richard Frewen Martin, DFC, (33439).
- Robert Wardlow Oxspring, DFC, (40743).

Acting Squadron Leader

- John Finch, DFC, (64308).

Flight Lieutenants

- Noel Joseph Adams (133036).
- Eric Rupert Chalk (175659), Royal Air Force Volunteer Reserve.
- Ronald Coates, DFC, (54395).
- Colin Ian Colquhoun, DFC, (162098).
- Arthur Graham Douglass (150340).
- George Ellams (49286).
- George Eric Clifford Genders, DFM, (120165).
- Archibald de Largy Greig, DFC, (56064).
- Neil Kenneth McCallum, DFC, (59350).
- Ronald George Milton (123196).
- Maxwell Scannell (59609).
- Dudley Scorgie (115082), Royal Air Force Volunteer Reserve.
- Philip Edward Herbert Thomas (60297).
- Ernest Harry Turner (52027).

Acting Flight Lieutenant

- Stanley Reginald Kellaway (195904).

Flying Officer

- Derek James Bryan Whitehead (203223).

Royal Australian Air Force

Flight Lieutenants

- Herbert John Collopy (Aus. 4198).
- Edward Charles Palmer (Aus. 418675).

Warrant Officer

- Noel Henry Peel (Aus. 23829).

=== Air Force Medal (AFM) ===
Royal Air Force

Flight Sergeant

- 542573 Donald James Spalding.

Pilot I

- 1344016 William Clunas Wood.

Sergeant

- 516540 Albert John Humphries.

Pilots II

- 1570997 William McCash.
- 1571212 Kenneth Strachan, Royal Air Force Volunteer Reserve.

Navigator II

- 533224 Albert Robinson.

Signaller II

- 1865956 Trevor Malcolm Laurent.

=== King's Commendation for Valuable Service in the Air ===
Royal Air Force

Wing Commander

- A. J. Shelfoon, AFC, (58281).

Squadron Leaders

- M. E. Blackstone, DFC, (72257).
- R. N. H. Courtney, DFC, (70852).
- A. K. Passmore, DFC, (40939).
- J. Rennie (47776).
- P. N. Smith, DFC, (88026).

Acting Squadron Leaders

- W. T. Ellis (110331).
- D. C. L. Webber, DFC, (116778).
- E. W. Wright, DFC, DFM, (64870).

Flight Lieutenants

- S. Allen (55118).
- P. Barber, DFC, (129476).
- G. J. Bolton (191155).
- E. A. Brtttain (152398).
- J. Campbell (120526).
- J. C. H. Cole (121275), Royal Air Force Volunteer Reserve.
- L. V. Dale (184935).
- R. V. Ecclestone, DFC, (175308).
- D. T. Evans (167821).
- B. J. L. Greenland (146422), Royal Air Force Volunteer Reserve.
- A. E. Hall (153138).
- N. W. Heale (177623).
- R. Houghton (179525).
- N. Lawson (52025).
- R. Lingard, DFC, (147208).
- J. A. W. Long (133263).
- D. G. Maddocks, DFC, (156087).
- G. W. Massey (163908).
- F. J. E. Moysey (190671).
- B. P. Mugford (128917).
- J. T. Newboult (163108).
- W. P. Peedell (161598), Royal Air Force Volunteer Reserve.
- H. Pugh (154374).
- J. Robertson (190102).
- G. D. Secretan (155459).
- P. Sherriff, DFC, (125575).
- P. A. Stanford, DFC, (130712).
- D. G. Walker (181075).
- W. J. Warn, DFC, (135406), Royal Air Force Volunteer Reserve.
- F. G. Woolley, DFC, (105174).

Flying Officer

- B. Sherwin (201566).

Master Pilot

- K. R. Price, DFM, (566286).

Pilots I

- 1320990 S. Evans.
- 1605715 R. J. Skinner.
- 591473 G. Stephen.

Signaller I

- 640445 D. James.

Pilots II

- 1391676 S. J. Brookfield.
- 1321163 P. M. S. Ecob.

Royal Navy

Lieutenant Commander

- E. M. Brown, OBE, DSC, AFC.

Army

Major

- A. C. Gow (233918), Royal Regiment of Artillery.

Royal Australian Air Force

Squadron Leaders

- D. R. Beattie (Aus. 260639).
- M. G. Whitworth (Aus. 3614).

Flight Lieutenants

- A. J. Bunyan (Aus. 420535).
- D. J. Campbell (Aus. 406639).
- R. Carlin (Aus. 405717).
- A. E. Delahunty (Aus. 412117).
- R. H. Glassop, DFC, (Aus. 403921).
- J. A. MacLeod (Aus. 425705).
- C. J. Melchert (Aus. 435511).
- G. Page (Aus. 9455).
- H. W. Pearson, DFC, (Aus. 425547).
- R. K. Starkie (Aus. 427162).
- R. J. Wheeler (Aus. 4228).

=== King's Police and Fire Services Medal (KPFSM) ===
England and Wales

Police

- Philip Theodore Briarly Browne, Chief Constable, Cumberland and Westmorland Constabulary.
- William John Jones, Chief Constable, Cardiganshire Constabulary.
- Albert Edward Rowsell, OBE, Chief Constable, Exeter City Police Force.
- Henry James Vann, Chief Constable, Birkenhead Borough Police Force.
- Kenneth Albert Horwood, Assistant Chief Constable, Kent Constabulary.
- Frederick Richardson, 2nd Assistant Chief Constable, Birmingham City Police Force.
- Albert John Norris, Superintendent, Northamptonshire Constabulary.
- Sidney William Inight, Detective Superintendent, Worcestershire Constabulary.
- Leonard Quelch, Superintendent, Oxford City Police Force.
- Albert Cornelius Bowler, Superintendent, Yorkshire, East Riding Constabulary.
- Charles Ferrier, Chief Inspector, Metropolitan Police Force.
- Frank Henry Long, Divisional Detective Inspector, Metropolitan Police Force.

Fire Services

- Charles Phillip McDuell, OBE, Deputy Chief Officer, London Fire Brigade.
- Burt Bellamy, Chief Officer, Oldham Fire Brigade.
- William Edward Norwood, Assistant Inspector, Home Office Fire Inspectorate.
- Haydon George Harry Harris, Station Officer (Part-time), Dorset County Fire Service.

Scotland

Police

- Captain Horace Frederick Moncrieff Munro, OBE, Chief Constable, Ayrshire Constabulary.
- Thomas Gray Smith, Chief Constable, Hamilton Burgh Police Force.

Fire Services

- Alexander McDonald Hume, Senior Company Officer, South Eastern Fire Brigade.

Northern Ireland

Police

- Reginald Rowland Spears, MBE, County Inspector, Royal Ulster Constabulary.

Colonies and Former Mandated Territory

- Kenneth Cleland, MBE, Acting Senior Superintendent of Police, Kenya.
- Lieutenant Colonel John Douglas Dalley, late Director, Malayan Security Services, Singapore.
- Douglas Nicol Livingstone, Assistant Superintendent of Police, Federation of Malaya.
- Geoffrey Dupuis Maydon, Superintendent (Head) of Grenada Police Force, Windward Islands.
- Ivo Herbert Evelyn Joseph Stourton, OBE, Commissioner of Police, Uganda.
- Joseph Richard Ullo, Commissioner of Police, Malta.
- Robert Vivian Douglas White, CPM, Assistant Commissioner of Police, Nigeria.
- Henry Michael Lawder Wilkinson, CPM, Superintendent of Police, Northern Rhodesia.

== India ==
=== King's Police and Fire Services Medal (KPFSM) ===
- Sri Shanker Dayal Shukul, IP, Officiating Deputy Inspector General of Police, Crime and Railways, Central Provinces and Berar.
- Sri Chandulal Shivram Pandya, Officiating District Superintendent of Police, Panch Mahals.
- Sri Sadasiho Murari Satam, Police Jemadar, Bombay City Police.
- Sri Saroshi Kumar Brahmachari, Deputy Commissioner of Police, Calcutta.
- Sri Bejoy Krishna Das, Officiating Inspector of Police, Special Branch, Calcutta.

== Ceylon ==
=== Knight Bachelor ===
- Arunachalam Mahadeva, formerly Minister for Home Affairs, Ceylon.

=== Order of Saint Michael and Saint George ===
==== Companion of the Order of St Michael and St George (CMG) ====
- Arthur Eric Christoffelsz, Principal Collector of Customs, Ceylon.
- William Oswald Stevens, Government Agent, Southern Province, Ceylon.

=== Order of the British Empire ===
==== Commander of the Order of the British Empire (CBE) ====
Civil Division

- Louis Edmund Blaze, OBE, formerly Principal, Kingswood College, Kandy.
- John Eric Sturton Bodger, General Manager, Ceylon Government Railway.
- Kanthiah Vaithianathan, Permanent Secretary to the Ministry of Defence and External Affairs.

==== Officer of the Order of the British Empire (OBE) ====
Military Division

- Lieutenant-Colonel William Augustus Radcliffe, Officer Commanding, Ceylon Army Service Corps.

Civil Division

- Cyril Francis Fernando, MD, MRCS, LRCP, Medical Officer and Physician, General Hospital, Colombo.
- Raja Hewavitarne, Minister of Labour, Industry and Commerce.
- Richard Henry David Manders, Government Agent, North Central Province.
- Raja Ratnam Nalliah, MBE, Proctor Supreme Court, Chairman, Urban Council, Jaffna.
- Benjamin Franklin Perera, Director of Rural Development.
- Charles Rajakone Tamjbiah, JP, Crown Proctor, Jaffna.

==== Member of the Order of the British Empire (MBE) ====
Military Division

- Major Reginald Lindsay Bartholomeusz, ED, Ceylon Garrison Artillery.
- Major Edmund Clarence De Fonseka, ED, Ceylon Light Infantry.

Civil Division

- Aboobucker Mohamed Abdul Azeez, Principal, Zahira College, Colombo.
- Punchi Banda Bulankulame, JP, Proctor, Parliamentary Secretary to the Minister of Agriculture and Lands.
- Hameed Hussain Sheikh Ismail, Proctor, Parliamentary Secretary to Minister of Food and Co-operative Undertakings.
- Martin Henry Jayatileke, Crown Proctor. Chairman, Rent Restriction Board, Panadura.
- Herman Eric Peries, Acting Deputy Secretary to the Treasury.
- Sugata Engletina Wijegooneratne. Office-bearer of many societies engaged in Social Service work.
