= Claiborne-Dallas-Boggs family =

American political family

The Claiborne-Dallas-Pell family is a family of politicians from the United States. Below is a list of members:

- Thomas Claiborne (1749–1812), member of the Virginia Legislature, U.S. Representative from Virginia 1793-1799 1801–1805. Father of John Claiborne and Thomas Claiborne.
  - Alexander J. Dallas (1759–1817), Secretary of Pennsylvania 1791–1801, U.S. District Attorney in Pennsylvania 1801–1814, U.S. Secretary of the Treasury 1814–1816. Father of George M. Dallas.
  - William C.C. Claiborne (1775–1817), delegate to the Tennessee Constitutional Convention 1796, Tennessee State Court Judge 1796, U.S. Representative from Tennessee 1797–1801, Governor of Mississippi Territory 1801–1804, Governor of the Territory of Orleans 1804–1812, Governor of Louisiana 1812–1816, U.S. Senator from Louisiana 1817. Nephew of Thomas Claiborne.
  - Nathaniel Herbert Claiborne (1777–1859), member of the Virginia Legislature, U.S. Representative from Virginia 1825–1837. Nephew of Thomas Claiborne.
  - John Claiborne (1777–1808), U.S. Representative from Virginia 1805–1808. Son of Thomas Claiborne.
  - Thomas Claiborne (1780–1856), Tennessee State Representative 1811-1815 1831–1833, U.S. Representative from Tennessee 1817–1819. Son of Thomas Claiborne.
    - George M. Dallas (1792–1864), Mayor of Philadelphia, Pennsylvania 1829; U.S. District Attorney in Pennsylvania 1829–1831; U.S. Senator from Pennsylvania 1831–1833; Attorney General of Pennsylvania 1833–1835; U.S. Minister to Russia 1837–1839; Vice President of the United States 1845–1849; U.S. Minister to Great Britain 1856–1861. Son of Alexander J. Dallas and great-great-granduncle of Claiborne Pell and great-great-great-great-granduncle of Clay Pell.
    - John Francis Hamtramck Claiborne (1807–1884), member of the Mississippi Legislature, U.S. Representative from Mississippi 1835-1837 1837–1838. Nephew of William C.C. Claiborne and Nathaniel Herbert Claiborne.
      - Robert J. Walker (1801–1869), U.S. Senator from Mississippi 1835–1845, U.S. Secretary of the Treasury 1845–1849, Governor of Kansas Territory 1857. Nephew by marriage of George M. Dallas.
        - Benjamin Harris Brewster (1816–1888), Attorney General of Pennsylvania 1867–1868, Attorney General of the United States 1882–1885. Son-in-law of Robert J. Walker.
          - Herbert Claiborne Pell, Jr. (1884–1961), U.S. Representative from New York 1919–1921, Chairman of the New York Democratic Committee 1921–1926, delegate to the Democratic National Convention 1924, U.S. Minister to Hungary 1941–1942. Great-grandson of John Francis Hamtramck Claiborne.
            - Claiborne Pell (1918–2009), U.S. Senator from Rhode Island 1961–1997. Son of Herbert Claiborne Pell, Jr., great-great-nephew of George M. Dallas.
                - Clay Pell (1981–), Candidate for Governor of Rhode Island 2014. Great-grandson of Herbert Claiborne Pell, Jr. Grandson of Claiborne Pell, great-great-great-great-nephew of George M. Dallas, and husband of Michelle Kwan.
                - Michelle Kwan (1980–), Retired figure skater. Wife of Clay Pell, granddaughter-in-law of Claiborne Pell, great-granddaughter-in-law of Herbert Claiborne Pell, Jr., and great-great-great-great-niece-in-law of George M. Dallas.
          - Hale Boggs (1914–1972), U.S. Representative from Louisiana 1941-1943 1947–1972, delegate to the Democratic National Convention 1948, candidate for Governor of Louisiana 1952. Husband of Corinne C. Boggs, great-great-grandnephew-in-law of John Francis Hamtramck Claiborne, and father-in-law of Steven V. Roberts.
          - Corinne C. Boggs (1916–2013), U.S. Representative from Louisiana 1973–1991, U.S. Ambassador to the Vatican 1997–2001. Great-great-grandniece of John Francis Hamtramck Claiborne and father-in-law of Steven V. Roberts.
            - Barbara Boggs Sigmund (1939–1990), delegate to the Democratic National Convention 1980, candidate for Democratic nomination for U.S. Senate from New Jersey 1982, Mayor of Princeton, New Jersey 1983–1990. Daughter of Hale Boggs and Corinne C. Boggs, sister of Thomas Hale Boggs, Jr., Cokie Roberts, and William Robertson Boggs, and great-great-great-grandniece of John Francis Hamtramck Claiborne.
            - Thomas Hale Boggs, Jr. (1940–2014), candidate for U.S. Representative from Maryland 1970. Son of Hale Boggs and Corinne C. Boggs and brother of Barbara Boggs Sigmund, Cokie Roberts, and William Robertson Boggs, and great-great-great-grandnephew of John Francis Hamtramck Claiborne.
            - Cokie Roberts (1943–2019), television journalist. Daughter of Hale Boggs and Corinne C. Boggs, sister of Barbara Boggs Sigmund, Thomas Hale Boggs, Jr., and William Robertson Boggs, and great-great-great-grandniece of John Francis Hamtramck Claiborne.
            - Steven V. Roberts (1943-), journalist, writer, political commentator. Husband of Cokie Roberts, son-in-law of Lindy Boggs and Hale Boggs, great-great-great-grandnephew-in-law of John Francis Hamtramck Claiborne, and brother-in-law of Thomas Hale Boggs, Jr., Barbara Boggs Sigmund, and William Robertson Boggs.
              - Rebecca Roberts (1970-), journalist. Daughter of Cokie Roberts and Steven V. Roberts, granddaughter of Lindy Boggs and Hale Boggs, niece of William Robertson Boggs, Thomas Hale Boggs, Jr., and Barbara Boggs Sigmund, and great-great-great-grandniece of John Francis Hamtrack Claiborne.
            - William Robertson Boggs (1946-1946). Son of Hale Boggs and Corrine C. Boggs and brother of Cokie Roberts, Barbara Boggs Sigmund, and Thomas Hale Boggs, Jr., and great-great-great-grandnephew of John Francis Hamtramck Claiborne.

NOTE: Robert J. Walker was also grandson-in-law of Continental Congressional Delegate Benjamin Franklin and son of U.S. District Court Judge Jonathan Hoge Walker. Corinne C. Boggs is also a distant relative of U.S. Representative Donald J. Cazayoux, Jr.

== See also ==
- List of United States political families
