= Gilbert Gude =

American politician (1923–2007)

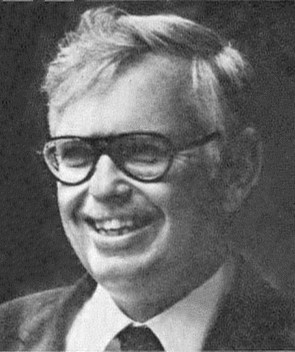

Member of the U.S. House of Representatives from Maryland's 8th district
- In office January 3, 1967 – January 3, 1977
- Preceded by: District created
- Succeeded by: Newton Steers

Member of the Maryland Senate
- In office 1962–1967

Member of the Maryland House of Delegates
- In office 1954–1958

Personal details
- Born: March 9, 1923 Washington, D.C., U.S.
- Died: June 7, 2007 (aged 84) Washington, D.C., U.S.
- Party: Republican
- Spouse: Jane Callaghan
- Children: 5
- Education: University of Maryland; Cornell University; George Washington University

Military service
- Allegiance: United States
- Branch/service: United States Army
- Years of service: 1943–1946
- Unit: Army Medical Department
- Battles/wars: World War II

Gilbert Gude (March 9, 1923 – June 7, 2007) was an American politician who served as the U.S. representative for Maryland's 8th congressional district from 1967 to 1977. He was a member of the Republican Party.

== Early life and career ==
Gude was born in Washington, D.C., and was educated in the public schools of Rockville, Maryland, and Washington. He attended the University of Maryland, obtained his B.S. degree from Cornell University in 1948, and his M.A. degree from George Washington University for Public Administration in 1958. He later taught history and environment courses at Georgetown University and served on the Board of Trustees for The Catholic University of America. During World War II, Gude served in the Pacific Theater as a part of the United States Army Medical Department from 1943 to 1946.

After the war, Gude was appointed to the Maryland House of Delegates in January 1953, and was later elected to the House of Delegates in 1954, serving until 1958. He was elected to the Republican State Central Committee in 1958, and elected to the Maryland State Senate in 1962, serving until 1967. Gude accomplished numerous things while in office, including sponsoring legislation that led to the building of the Washington Metro system, leading efforts to save the Chesapeake and Ohio Canal and create the Chesapeake and Ohio Canal National Historical Park, and supporting D.C. home rule. He was a delegate to the Republican State convention in 1952, and a delegate to the Republican National Convention in 1968.

== Congressional career ==
Gude was elected as a Republican to the 90th Congress and to the four succeeding Congresses, serving from January 3, 1967, until January 3, 1977, but was not a candidate for reelection in 1976 to the 95th Congress. Gude voted in favor of the Civil Rights Act of 1968. In 1970, he defeated the Democratic candidate Thomas Hale Boggs Jr., later a prominent lawyer and lobbyist in Washington, D.C., and the son of Gude's colleague, U.S. Representative Hale Boggs and then Lindy Boggs of Louisiana's 2nd congressional district, based about New Orleans.

Gude described himself as being socially liberal on civil rights and moderate on economic policies.

During his tenure in Congress, Gude served on the Government Operations Committee and its Conservation, Energy, and Natural Resources Subcommittee; the House Environmental Study; the Franklin Delano Roosevelt Memorial Commission; the Select Committee on Aging and its Retirement Income and Employment Subcommittee; and the House District of Columbia Committee and its Commerce, Housing and Transportation Subcommittee. Gude was a congressional observer at the United Nations Conference on the Human Environment in Stockholm, Sweden, in 1972, and later as director of the Library of Congress' Congressional Research Service from 1977 to 1985. Gude served as a member and is former chairman of the Consultative Committee of Experts, International Centre for Parliamentary Documentation of the Inter-Parliamentary Union of Geneva.

After Gude left Congress in 1977, a person from Capitol Hill stated: "When you start losing the Gil Gudes, then Congress is in trouble."

== Death ==
Gude died on June 7, 2007, from congestive heart failure in Washington, D.C. He was survived by his widow, Jane, five children (Adrienne, Daniel, Sharon, Brett and Gregory) and three grandchildren (Edward W. Lewis IV, Alexandra Morgan Lewis, and Michael Gude). His wife Jane was the daughter of U.S. Navy Vice Admiral William M. Callaghan.

== Election results ==
Maryland's 8th congressional district election (new district), 1966
| Party | Candidate | Votes | % |
|---|---|---|---|
| Republican | Gilbert Gude | 71,050 | 54.40 |
| Democratic | Royce Hanson | 59,568 | 45.60 |
| Total votes | | 130,618 | 100.00 |

Maryland's 8th congressional district election, 1968
| Party | Candidate | Votes | % |
|---|---|---|---|
| Republican | Gilbert Gude (Incumbent) | 109,167 | 60.89 |
| Democratic | Margaret C. Schweinhaut | 70,109 | 39.11 |
| Total votes | | 179,276 | 100.00 |
| Republican hold | | | |

Maryland's 8th congressional district election, 1970
| Party | Candidate | Votes | % |
|---|---|---|---|
| Republican | Gilbert Gude (Incumbent) | 104,647 | 63.38 |
| Democratic | Thomas Hale Boggs, Jr. | 60,456 | 36.62 |
| Total votes | | 165,103 | 100.00 |
| Republican hold | | | |

Maryland's 8th congressional district election, 1972
| Party | Candidate | Votes | % |
|---|---|---|---|
| Republican | Gilbert Gude (Incumbent) | 137,287 | 63.90 |
| Democratic | Joseph G. Anastasi | 77,551 | 36.10 |
| Total votes | | 214,838 | 100.00 |
| Republican hold | | | |

Maryland's 8th congressional district election, 1974
| Party | Candidate | Votes | % |
|---|---|---|---|
| Republican | Gilbert Gude (Incumbent) | 104,675 | 65.92 |
| Democratic | Sidney Kramer | 54,112 | 34.08 |
| Total votes | | 158,787 | 100.00 |
| Republican hold | | | |

U.S. House of Representatives
| Preceded by District created after at-large representation | Member of the U.S. House of Representatives from Maryland's 8th congressional district January 3, 1967 – January 3, 1977 | Succeeded by Newton Steers |
