= Lee Roberts =

Lea or Lee Roberts may refer to:

- Lee Roberts (actor) (1913–1989), American lead and character at Poverty Row
- Lea Roberts (born 1966), English comedian and rugby league player
- Lee Roberts (university administrator) (born 1968), American chancellor of University of North Carolina at Chapel Hill
- Lee Roberts (basketball) (born 1987), American power forward and center
