= Hope Hope-Clarke =

WWI-era British charity campaigner

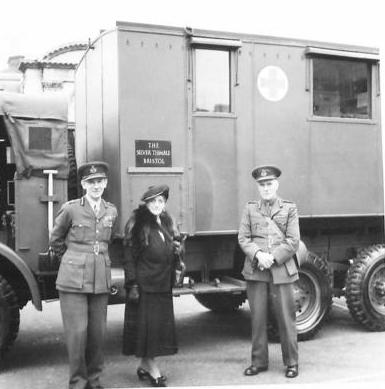
Hope-Clark presenting two mobile laboratories to the RAMC in 1941

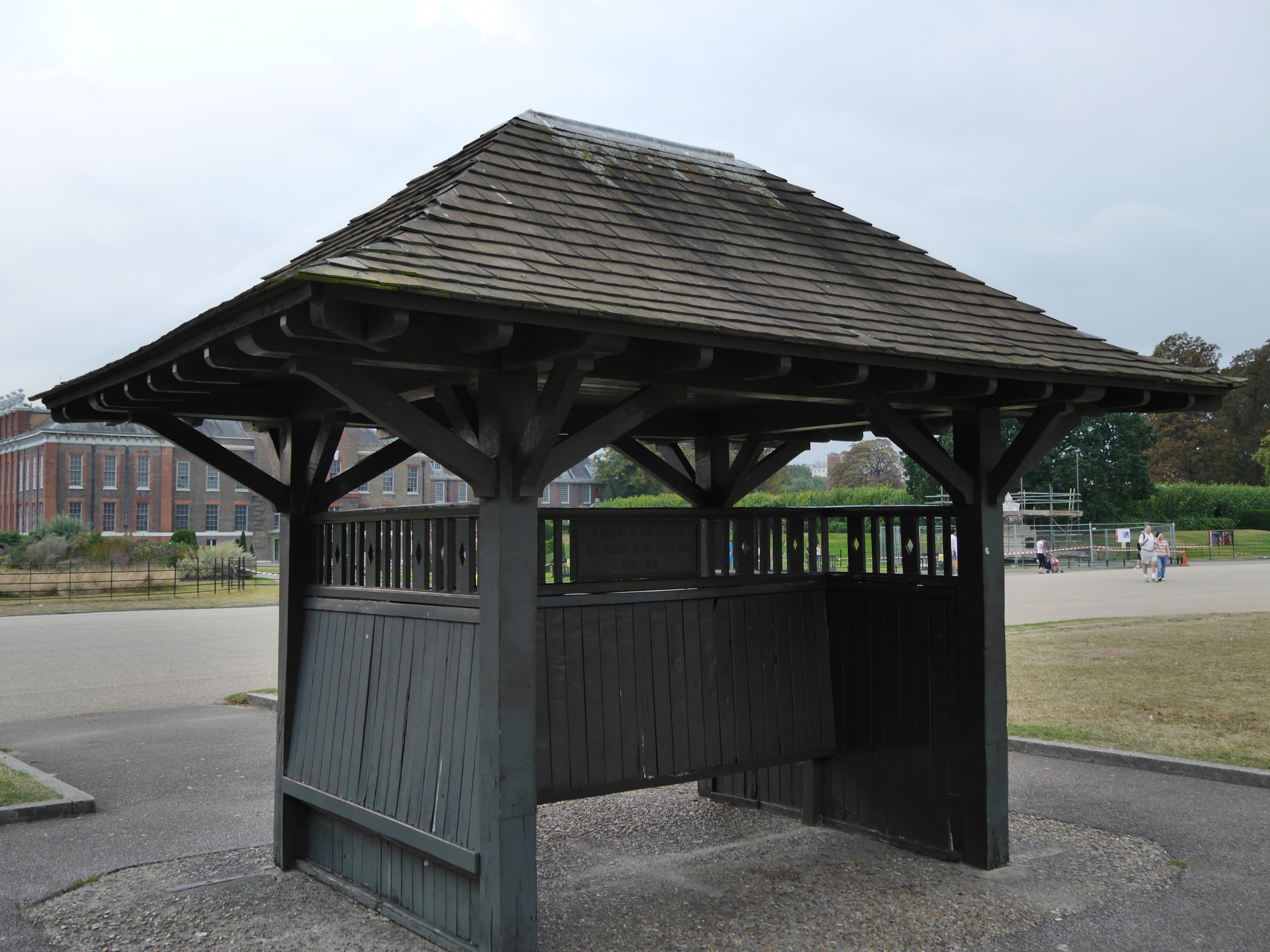
The southernmost of the War Memorial Shelters, built with money raised by the Silver Thimble Fund

Hope Elizabeth Hope-Clarke CBE (February 1870 – 19 July 1950) was a British charity campaigner, the founder and honorary organiser of the Silver Thimble Fund, "one of the most successful charities of the First World War".

Hope Elizabeth Hope-Clarke was born in February 1870, in Calcutta, British India.

A few years after the war ended, Hope-Clarke moved to the United States and settled in New Orleans, where she befriended Martha Gilmore Robinson, who set up the Silver Thimble Fund of America, which helped injured British and American soldiers in the Second World War.

Hope-Clarke was awarded an OBE in the 1949 New Year Honours List.

Hope-Clarke died in London on 19 July 1950, at the age of 80.
