= Rebecca Roberts =

American journalist (born 1970)

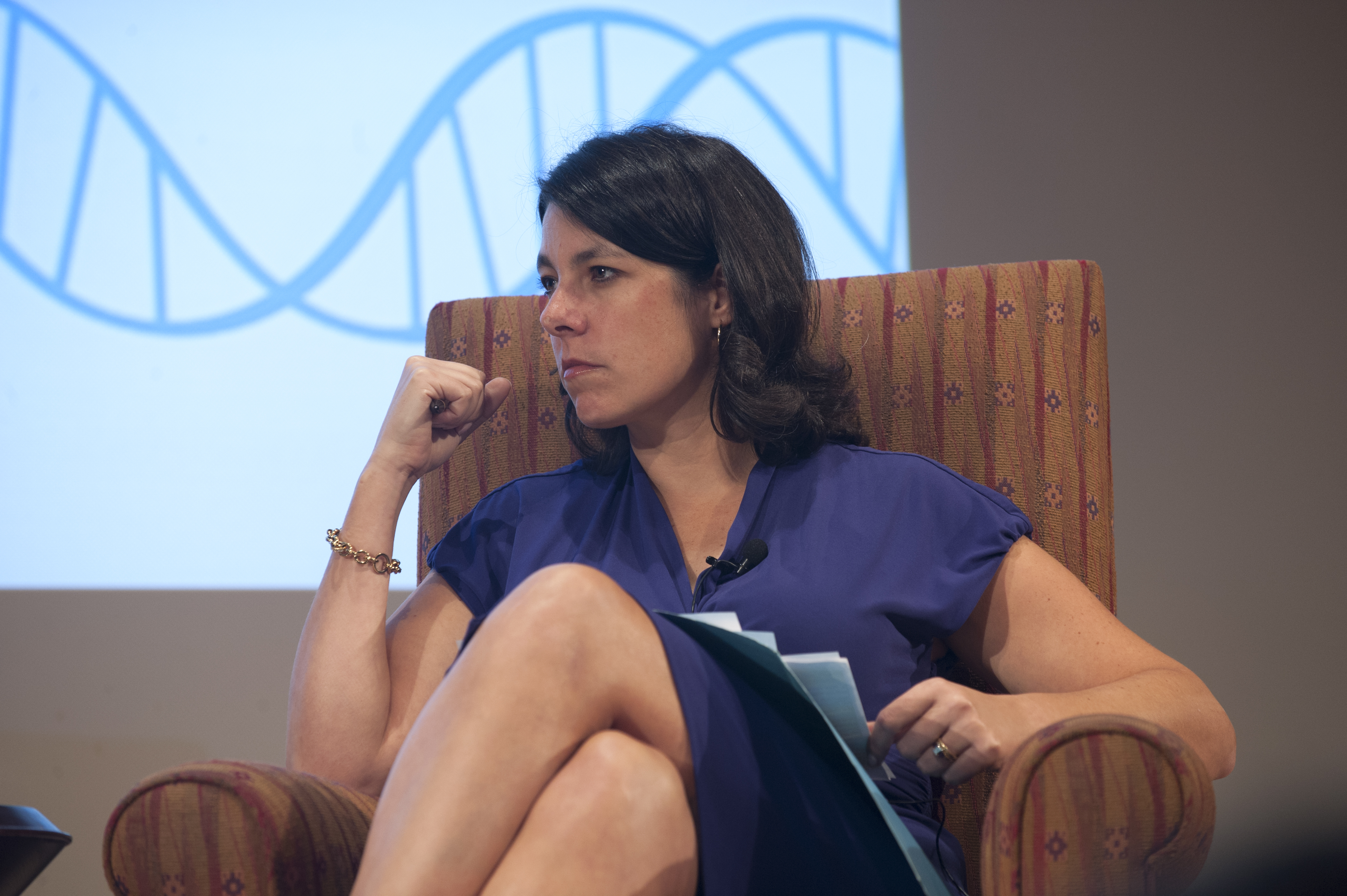
- Rebecca Roberts moderating a discussion at NHGRI in 2014.
- Born: Rebecca Boggs Roberts; 1970 (age 55–56); Los Angeles, California, U.S.
- Education: Princeton University (BA)
- Occupation: Journalist
- Known for: Radio personality
- Spouse: Daniel Jay Hartman (m. 1997)
- Parent(s): Steven V. Roberts; Cokie Roberts
- Relatives: Hale Boggs (grandfather); Lindy Boggs (grandmother); Barbara Boggs Sigmund (aunt); Thomas Hale Boggs, Jr. (uncle); Lee H. Roberts (brother)

Rebecca Boggs Roberts (born 1970) is the current Literary Director at the Library of Congress, formerly the Curator of Programming at Planet Word, and a former American journalist. She was one of the hosts of POTUS '08 on XM Radio, which offered live daily coverage of the 2008 presidential election. She served as a substitute host for Morning Edition, Talk of the Nation, and Weekend Edition Sunday on National Public Radio.

== Biography ==
Born to reporters Cokie (née Boggs) and Steve Roberts, Roberts earned a B.A. in political science from Princeton University.

Roberts began with Shorr & Associates, a political media firm in Philadelphia. She was technology reporter for The World, a radio program produced by the BBC and Public Radio International, for four years. She hosted Your Call, a local call-in program, on KALW in San Francisco and moved to Washington, D.C., to host The Intersection, a news talk show, on WETA from 2006 to 2007. For NPR, she has reported on such diverse topics as the US immigration debate, the Israeli–Palestinian conflict, transgenic goats, amateur astronomers, Bikram yoga, and Icelandic geysers.

She served as Program Director of the Congressional Cemetery.

== Works ==
Roberts' books include:

- with Schmidt, Sandra K. (2012). Historic Congressional Cemetery. Arcadia Publishing Library Editions. ISBN 978-1-5316-6228-8.
- Suffragists in Washington, D.C. : The 1913 Parade and the Fight for the Vote. Charleston, SC. 2017. ISBN 978-1625859402.
- Robb, Lucinda; Boggs Roberts, Rebecca (2020). The Suffragist Playbook : Your Guide to Changing the World (First ed.). Somerville, Massachusetts. ISBN 978-1536210330.
- Untold Power: The Fascinating Rise and Complex Legacy of First Lady Edith Wilson. New York City, NY. 2023. ISBN 978-0593489994.
