= Barbara Boggs Sigmund =

American politician (1939–1990)

Mayor of the Borough of Princeton, New Jersey
- In office 1983 – October 10, 1990

Personal details
- Born: Barbara Boggs; May 27, 1939 New Orleans, Louisiana, U.S.
- Died: October 10, 1990 (aged 51) Princeton, New Jersey, U.S.
- Party: Democratic
- Spouse: Paul Sigmund
- Children: 3
- Parent(s): Hale Boggs; Lindy Boggs
- Relatives: Cokie Roberts (sister); Tommy Boggs (brother); Rebecca Roberts (niece); Lee H. Roberts (nephew)
- Education: Manhattanville College

Barbara Boggs Sigmund (May 27, 1939 – October 10, 1990) was an American writer, Democratic politician, and civic leader. She served as a Mercer County Freeholder and mayor of the Borough of Princeton, New Jersey from 1983 to 1990. She finished fourth in the primary for U.S. Senate in 1982 and a distant second in the primary for Governor of New Jersey in 1989.

She was the daughter of Hale Boggs and Lindy Boggs, who both represented Louisiana in the United States House of Representatives.

== Biography ==
A graduate of Stone Ridge School of the Sacred Heart and Manhattanville College, she taught at the Stuart Country Day School of the Sacred Heart (Princeton, N.J.), which annually confers the Barbara Boggs Sigmund Alumnae Award in honor of her life.

Sigmund worked as a letter writer for President John F. Kennedy, and served as a member of the Mercer County, New Jersey Board of Chosen Freeholders. In 1982, she finished fourth out of nine in the 1982 New Jersey Democratic Senate primary, which was won by Frank Lautenberg (who went on to serve nearly 29 years in the Senate). The other two candidates with more votes were former United States Congressmen. She was elected Mayor of the Borough of Princeton, New Jersey from 1983 to her death in 1990.

Sigmund founded Womanspace, a Mercer County, New Jersey non-profit agency that provides 24-hour hotlines, crisis intervention, emergency shelter, counseling, court advocacy, and housing to victims and survivors of domestic and sexual violence.

Sigmund was diagnosed with cancer in the early 1980s, and lost an eye to the disease, necessitating an eyepatch. The patch became iconic when she attended events as mayor sporting an eye patch matched to her outfit. She died from cancer at her home in Princeton, New Jersey, on October 10, 1990, aged 51.

Her siblings were Cokie Roberts and Tommy Boggs.

Though her political work was in New Jersey, Sigmund was inducted posthumously in 2005 into the Louisiana Political Museum and Hall of Fame in Winnfield. The Hall of Fame had earlier inducted her father and mother.
