= James R. Claiborne =

American politician and lawyer (1882–1944)

Member of the U.S. House of Representatives from Missouri
- In office March 4, 1933 – January 3, 1937
- Preceded by: Seat created
- Succeeded by: C. Arthur Anderson
- Constituency: At-large (1933–1935); 12th (1935–1937)

Personal details
- Born: James Robert Claiborne Jr. June 22, 1882 St. Louis, Missouri, US
- Died: February 16, 1944 (aged 61) University City, Missouri, US
- Party: Democratic
- Relations: Claiborne-Dallas-Boggs family
- Occupation: Politician, lawyer

James Robert Claiborne Jr. (June 22, 1882 – February 16, 1944) was an American politician and lawyer. A Democrat, he was a member of the United States House of Representatives from Missouri.

== Biography ==
Claiborne was born on June 22, 1882, in St. Louis. He was a son of James R. Claiborne Sr. and Frances (née Moore) Claiborne; his father had served in the Confederate States Army during the American Civil War. He was the grandson of politician Nathaniel Claiborne, and thereby a member of the Claiborne-Dallas-Boggs family.

Educated at public schools, Claiborne studied at the University of Missouri School of Law, graduating in 1907. Also in 1907, he was admitted to the bar, after which he commenced practice in St. Louis. As a lawyer, he represented many workers involved in the 1910 St. Louis garment workers' strike. For over ten years, he lectured at the Saint Louis University School of Law.

Claiborne was a Democrat. In 1924, he unsuccessfully ran in the election for Judge of the United States Court of Appeals for the Eighth Circuit. He served two terms in the United States House of Representatives, from March 4, 1933, to January 3, 1937. He represented Missouri's at-large district in his first term, and its 12th district in his second term. He lost the following Democratic primaries. Congress was the first and only public office he served in.

Claiborne opposed the New Deal. In 1936, he voted against the Adjusted Compensation Payment Act, the only Missouri congressman to do so. Beginning in 1934, he pushed for increased defense spending and an end to non-interventionalism. He also supported repealing of the Eighteenth Amendment to the United States Constitution and high tariffs.

After serving in Congress, Claiborne continued practicing law in St. Louis. On November 26, 1919, he married Louise Minnis; they had two children together, James R. Claiborne Jr. and Martha Ann Claiborne. He died on February 16, 1944, aged 61, in University City, from a intracerebral hemorrhage. He was buried at Oak Grove Cemetery, in Bel-Nor.

U.S. House of Representatives
Preceded by Seat created	Member of the U.S. House of Representatives from Missouri's at-large congressional district 1933–1935	Succeeded by Seat inactive
Preceded by Leonidas C. Dyer	Member of the U.S. House of Representatives from Missouri's 12th congressional district 1935–1937	Succeeded by Charles A. Anderson
