= H. Garland Dupré =

American politician (1873–1924)

Henry Garland Dupré
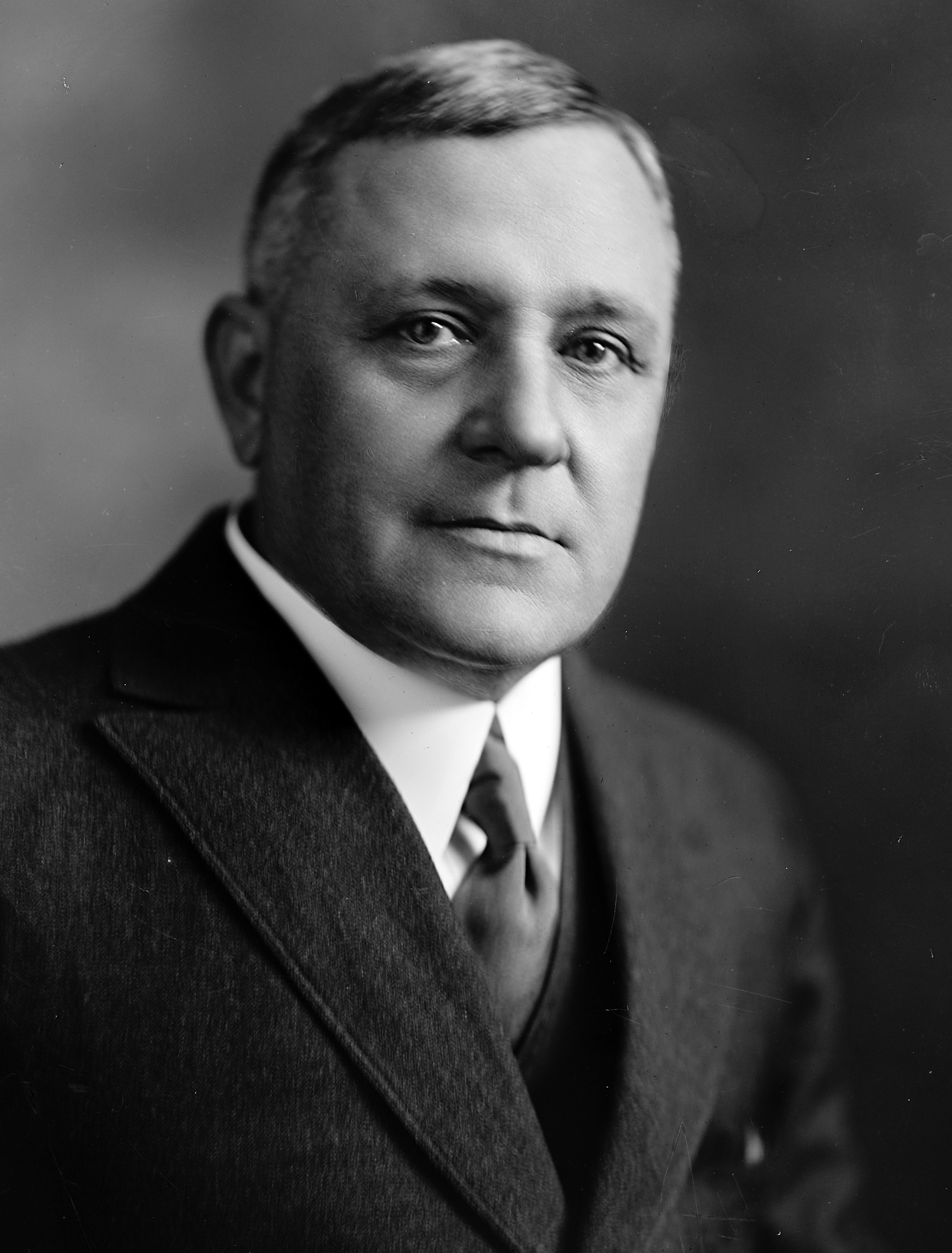
- Dupré, 1905–1924

Member of the U. S. House of Representatives from Louisiana's 2nd district
- In office November 8, 1910 – February 21, 1924
- Preceded by: Samuel Louis Gilmore
- Succeeded by: James Z. Spearing

Speaker of the Louisiana House of Representatives
- In office 1908–1910
- Preceded by: Joseph W. Hyams
- Succeeded by: Lee Emmett Thomas

Louisiana State Representative from District 14 (Orleans Parish)
- In office 1900–1910
- Preceded by: Dr. Stewart L. Henry
- Succeeded by: Martin Henry Manion

Personal details
- Born: July 28, 1873 Opelousas, St. Landry Parish; Louisiana, USA
- Died: February 21, 1924 (aged 50) Washington, D.C.
- Resting place: Catholic Cemetery in Opelousas
- Party: Democratic
- Parent(s): Laurent and Marie Celeste Garland Dupré
- Education: Tulane University; Tulane University Law School
- Occupation: Lawyer

Henry Garland Dupré (July 28, 1873 – February 21, 1924) was from 1910 to 1924 a Democratic member of the United States House of Representatives for Louisiana's 2nd congressional district, based about New Orleans, Louisiana.

Born in Opelousas in St. Landry Parish in south Louisiana, Dupré attended public schools and graduated in 1892 from Tulane University in New Orleans and thereafter the Tulane University Law School. In 1895, he was admitted to the bar and began his law practice in New Orleans.

He served as assistant city attorney of New Orleans from 1900 to 1910. During that same period, he was the District 14 member of the Louisiana House of Representatives for Orleans Parish. He was House Speaker from 1908 to 1910. In 1908, he chaired the Louisiana Democratic State Convention.

Dupré was elected to the Sixty-first Congress to fill the vacancy caused by the death of Samuel Louis Gilmore. He was reelected to the Sixty-second and the six succeeding Congresses and served from November 8, 1910, until his death in Washington, D.C., on February 21, 1924. He is interred at the Catholic Cemetery in his native Opelousas.

== See also ==
- List of members of the United States Congress who died in office (1900–1949)

Preceded by Dr. Stewart L. Henry	Louisiana State Representative from District 14 (Orleans Parish); H. Garland Dupré; 1900–1910	Succeeded by Martin Henry Manion
Preceded by Joseph W. Hyams (West Baton Rouge Parish)	Speaker of the Louisiana House of Representatives; H. Garland Dupré; 1908–1910	Succeeded by Lee Emmett Thomas (Caddo Parish)
U.S. House of Representatives
Preceded by Samuel Louis Gilmore	U.S. Representative from Louisiana's 2nd congressional district H. Garland Dupré; 1910–1924	Succeeded by James Z. Spearing
