= James Z. Spearing =

American politician

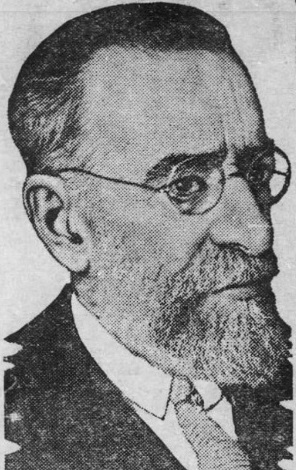
- Spearing in 1924

Member of the United States House of Representatives from Louisiana's 2nd district
- In office April 22, 1924 – March 3, 1931
- Preceded by: Henry Garland Dupré
- Succeeded by: Paul H. Maloney

Member of the Orleans Parish School Board
- In office 1908–1912
- In office 1916–1920

Member of the Louisiana State Board of Education
- In office 1912–1916

Personal details
- Born: James Zacharie Spearing; April 23, 1864 Alto, Texas, U.S.
- Died: November 2, 1942 (aged 78) New Orleans, Louisiana, U.S.
- Resting place: Metairie Cemetery
- Party: Democratic
- Education: Tulane University Law School
- Occupation: Lawyer

James Zacharie Spearing (April 23, 1864 – November 2, 1942) was an American attorney and politician, who served as a U.S. representative from Louisiana's 2nd congressional district from 1924 to 1931.

Born in Alto in Cherokee County, Texas, Spearing moved with his parents in 1866 to New Orleans, where he attended public schools. He left school and went to work in 1877. In 1886, he obtained a degree from Tulane University School of Law in New Orleans. That same year, he was admitted to the bar and began his legal practice in New Orleans.

He served as member of the Orleans Parish School Board from 1908 to 1912 and again from 1916 to 1920 and as president in 1919 and 1920. Between the parish school board terms, he was a member of the Louisiana State Board of Education from 1912 to 1916. He was an alternate delegate to the 1912 Democratic National Convention, which nominated the Wilson-Marshall ticket, which handily won the electoral votes of Louisiana.

Spearing was elected to the Sixty-eighth Congress to fill the vacancy caused by the death of H. Garland Dupré. He was reelected to the 69th, 70th, and 71st Congress and served from April 22, 1924, to March 3, 1931. He was an unsuccessful candidate for renomination in 1930. Thereafter, he resumed the practice of law in New Orleans, where he died and is interred at Metairie Cemetery in New Orleans.

U.S. House of Representatives
| Preceded by H. Garland Dupré | U.S. Representative for Louisiana's 2nd congressional district 1924–1931 | Succeeded by Paul H. Maloney |
