= 1989 New Jersey gubernatorial election =

- November 7, 1989
- Turnout: 60% (▲8pp)
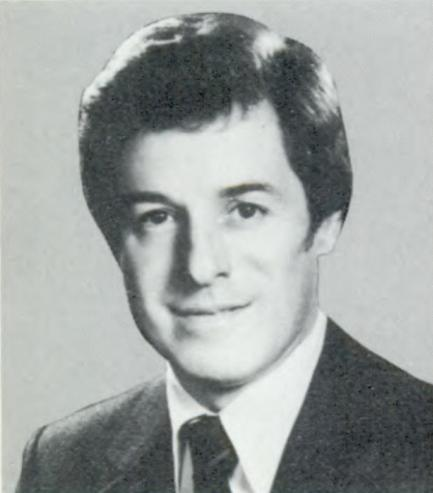

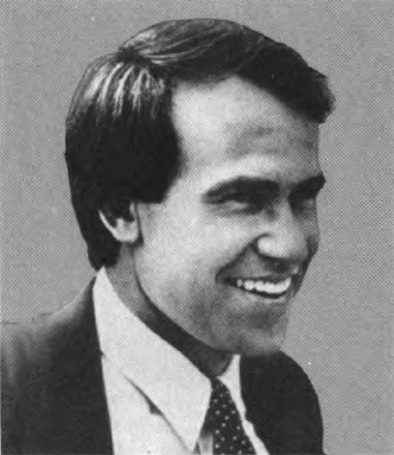
Nominee	James Florio	Jim Courter
Party	Democratic	Republican
Popular vote	1,379,937	838,553
Percentage	61.23%	37.21%
- Florio: 50–60% 60–70% 70–80% 80–90% Courter: 50–60%
Governor before election
Thomas Kean
Republican
Elected Governor
James Florio
Democratic

The 1989 New Jersey gubernatorial election was held on November 7, 1989. Incumbent Republican Governor Thomas Kean was term-limited after two consecutive terms. Democrat James Florio, a U.S. Representative from Camden County and a twice-unsuccessful candidate for Governor, defeated Republican U.S. Representative Jim Courter by the lopsided margin of 61.2%-37.2%.

Primary elections were held on Tuesday, June 6. Courter won the Republican nomination over a large field that included state Attorney General W. Cary Edwards, Speaker of the Assembly Chuck Hardwick, and State Senators Bill Gormley and Gerald Cardinale. Florio, who had run in 1977 and 1981, won the Democratic nomination with little trouble over Princeton mayor Barbara Boggs Sigmund and former Speaker Alan Karcher.

The Washington Post called the election "one of the most negative gubernatorial campaigns in the state's history". Democrats also won back the New Jersey General Assembly on Florio's coattails.

== Republican primary ==
=== Candidates ===
- Tom Blomquist, retired Coast Guard captain
- Gerald Cardinale, State Senator from Demarest
- Jim Courter, U.S. Representative from Hackettstown
- W. Cary Edwards, New Jersey Attorney General
- William Gormley, State Senator from Mays Landing
- Chuck Hardwick, Speaker of the General Assembly
- James A. Kolyer, industrial arts teacher
- Lois Rand, former head of the New Jersey Small Business Administration

Speaker Hardwick announced his campaign on February 9.

=== Campaign ===
Hardwick presented himself as a slightly more conservative version of Kean, even noting their physical similarities: part of his stump speech was to ask, "How can a Republican Assembly Speaker with a gap-toothed smile, who isn't a lawyer, expect to be Governor?" Nevertheless, he was critical of Kean's proposals for property tax reform, coastal commission to manage growth on the Jersey shore, and his renomination New Jersey Supreme Court Chief Justice Robert Wilentz, a liberal. Hardwick, himself a former commuter, also picked a public fight on behalf of New Jersey commuters with Governor of New York Mario Cuomo, attacking New York's income tax on New Jerseyans working in New York City.

The Hardwick campaign actively sought endorsement from New Jersey Right to Life, the NRA Political Victory Fund, and police officers' groups in an attempt to attract unaffiliated voters into the Republican primary. Hardwick won some early victories, including a non-binding Middlesex County Republican Convention, where he took 51% of the delegates in a county Courter represented in Congress.

As the campaign concluded and polls showed Courter narrowly behind, he remained confident of victory.

=== Endorsements ===
List of Jim Courter endorsements

U.S. Representatives

- Dean Gallo, U.S. Representative from Parsippany-Troy Hills

County officials

- Kathleen Donovan, Bergen County Clerk
List of W. Cary Edwards endorsements

State executive branch officials

- Anthony M. Villane, New Jersey Commissioner of Community Affairs

State legislators

- Pat Schuber, State Assemblyman from Bogota

Individuals

- John Inganamort, chair of the Bergen County Republican Organization
- Bill Palatucci, campaign manager
List of Bill Gormley endorsements

Individuals

- George Geist, Camden County Republican Organization chair
List of Chuck Hardwick endorsements

Individuals

- Jeff Bell, Republican nominee for U.S. Senate in 1978

=== Polling ===
Poll source	Date(s) administered	Sample size	Margin of error	Gerald Cardinale	Jim Courter	W. Cary Edwards	Bill Gormley	Chuck Hardwick	Undecided
Political Media Research Inc.	May 19–22, 1989	415	±5.0%	5%	20%	12%	17%	16%	30%
Political Media Research Inc.	May 29–31, 1989		±5.0%	4%	19%	23%	17%	21%	16%

=== Campaign finance ===
Primary campaign finance activity
Candidate	Spent
Jim Courter	$2,516,660
Cary Edwards	$2,431,717
Chuck Hardwick	$2,383,704
William Gormley	$2,213,532
Gerald Cardinale	$1,150,994
Tom Blomquist	$26,789
Source: New Jersey Election Law Enforcement Commission

=== Results ===
Republican Party primary results
Party	Candidate	Votes	%
Republican	Jim Courter	112,326	29.02
Republican	W. Cary Edwards	85,313	22.04
Republican	Chuck Hardwick	82,392	21.29
Republican	William Gormley	66,430	17.17
Republican	Gerald Cardinale	32,250	8.33
Republican	Tom Blomquist	3,791	0.98
Republican	Lois Rand	2,553	0.66
Republican	James A. Kolyer	1,963	0.51
Total votes		387,018	100.00

On primary election night, Courter declared victory at around 11:15 P.M., after only Hardwick had conceded. He announced that his campaign would focus on lower insurance rates, lower property taxes, and a stronger death penalty. By then aware that Jim Florio would be his opponent, Courter said the race would be "a great confrontation... a great debate between two people." He emphasized his support for Governor Kean, whom he called "the greatest governor this state has ever had." Campaign advisors attributed his win to a strong performance in his own congressional district, where he outpolled the field two-to-one in every county.

Edwards attributed his loss to Gormley: "We're good friends, but if one of us had been candidates, I think that the other one would have won." Hardwick admitted that his campaign had been slipping in internal polling and he had realized he would lose a week before the election. All of the competitive candidates agreed to support Courter actively in the general election.

== Democratic primary ==
=== Candidates ===
- James Florio, U.S. Representative and candidate for governor in 1977 and 1981
- Alan Karcher, former Speaker of the New Jersey General Assembly
- Barbara Boggs Sigmund, Mayor of Princeton and former Mercer County Freeholder

=== Polling ===
Poll source	Date(s) administered	Sample size	Margin of error	Jim Florio	Alan Karcher	Barbara Sigmund	Undecided
Political Media Research Inc.	May 24, 1989			43%	16%	16%	26%
Political Media Research Inc.	May 29–31, 1989		±5.0%	57%	12%	13%	17%

=== Campaign finance ===
Primary campaign finance activity
Candidate	Spent
Jim Florio	$2,433,075
Alan Karcher	$1,190,191
Barbara Sigmund	$687,361
Lois Rand	$480
Source: New Jersey Election Law Enforcement Commission

=== Results ===
Democratic Party primary results
Party	Candidate	Votes	%
Democratic	James Florio	251,979	68.23
Democratic	Barbara Boggs Sigmund	61,033	16.53
Democratic	Alan Karcher	56,311	15.25
Total votes		369,323	100.00

== General election ==
=== Candidates ===
- Jim Courter, U.S. Representative from Hackettstown (Republican)
- James Florio, U.S. Representative from Camden and nominee for governor in 1981 (Democratic)
- Tom Fuscaldo, owner of a television antenna business (One Eye On)
- Daniel M. Karlan, computer programmer (Libertarian)
- Catherine Renee Sedwick (Socialist Workers)
- Michael Ziruolo, trucking consultant (Better Affordable Government)

=== Campaign ===
Florio, who had run in the Democratic primary for Governor in 1977 and had lost an extremely close general election in 1981 to Thomas Kean, stressed in this campaign that he would govern more like Kean than the conservative Courter would. Florio also contended that he would lead an active government to combat potential overdevelopment and pollution. To moderate his positions, Florio promised a wider use of the state death penalty for drug crimes. Florio also said: "You can write this statement down: 'Florio feels there is no need for new taxes'". (Florio broke the latter promise in 1990, when he signed a $2.8-billion tax increase.)

Following a Supreme Court ruling that would allow states to impose regulations on abortions, Courter—who had an anti-abortion voting record in Congress—sought to moderate his position, causing voters to distrust him.

The campaign was notable for its negativity. In September, Florio released a televised attack ad contending that Courter had failed "to clean up toxic wastes on his own property". Courter challenged that assertion and accused Florio of taking campaign donations from a union with mob ties. According to The New York Times, "both candidates aired their own 'Pinocchio' spots accusing the other of lying on various issues". In their first debate, Courter called himself an environmentalist; Florio responded, 'Cut me a break'".

=== Polling ===
Poll source	Date(s) administered	Sample size	Margin of error	Jim Florio (D)	Jim Courter (R)	Undecided
Star-Ledger/Eagleton	June 12–20, 1989	647 RV	±4.0%	49%	32%	17%
Star-Ledger/Eagleton	September 20–28, 1989	707 LV	±3.8%	53%	30%	17%
Star-Ledger/Eagleton	October 12–19, 1989	727 LV	±3.8%	49%	32%	19%
Star-Ledger/Eagleton	Oct. 29–Nov. 2, 1989	989 LV	±3.2%	54%	28%	18%
Star-Ledger/Eagleton	Oct. 29–Nov. 2, 1989	632 PV	±4.0%	54%	30%	16%

=== Campaign finance ===
Primary campaign finance activity
Candidate	Spent
Jim Florio	$5,591,824
Jim Courter	$5,350,986
Daniel Karlan	$875
Michael Ziruolo	$150
Source: New Jersey Election Law Enforcement Commission

=== Results ===
This is the most recent gubernatorial election in New Jersey in which the Democratic nominee won with over 60% of the vote, and the last in which either party did so until 2013. This is the only time Democrats carried Somerset County in a gubernatorial election between 1973 and 2017.

New Jersey Gubernatorial Election, 1989
Party	Candidate	Votes	%	±%
Democratic	James Florio	1,379,937	61.23%	▲31.91
Republican	Jim Courter	838,553	37.21%	▼32.37
Libertarian	Daniel M. Karlan	11,878	0.53%	▲0.29
Independent	Michael Ziruolo	10,210	0.45%	N/A
Independent	Tom Fuscaldo	6,989	0.31%	N/A
Socialist Workers	Catherine Renee Sedwick	6,197	0.28%	▲0.09
Majority		541,384	24.02%	
Turnout		2,253,764		
Democratic gain from Republican		Swing		

==== By county ====
County	Florio %	Florio votes	Courter %	Courter votes	Other %	Other votes
Atlantic	64.8%	39,917	34.2%	21,087	0.9%	598
Bergen	59.2%	165,104	39.2%	109,184	1.6%	4,524
Burlington	62.8%	67,600	36.0%	38,774	1.3%	1,345
Camden	71.6%	106,836	27.5%	41,007	1.0%	1,448
Cape May	55.3%	19,642	43.4%	15,408	1.2%	445
Cumberland	63.5%	23,906	35.3%	13,304	1.2%	439
Essex	68.9%	131,835	29.9%	57,206	1.1%	2,206
Gloucester	68.8%	47,760	30.1%	20,871	1.2%	777
Hudson	73.7%	95,122	25.0%	32,215	1.4%	1,754
Hunterdon	42.9%	14,164	54.6%	18,046	2.5%	838
Mercer	68.5%	67,962	30.1%	29,887	1.3%	1,359
Middlesex	62.9%	120,157	35.1%	67,054	1.9%	3,749
Monmouth	57.7%	101,995	40.9%	72,403	1.4%	2,498
Morris	47.1%	61,678	51.7%	67,592	1.1%	1,567
Ocean	56.1%	83,587	42.1%	62,700	1.8%	2,669
Passaic	60.5%	67,934	37.5%	42,106	2.0%	2,271
Salem	57.6%	11,644	39.3%	7,938	3.2%	637
Somerset	50.5%	37,159	47.3%	34,815	2.2%	1,679
Sussex	41.5%	14,901	56.0%	20,096	2.5%	890
Union	61.2%	89,419	36.7%	53,636	2.2%	3,039
Warren	45.8%	11,615	52.1%	13,224	2.1%	542

Counties that flipped from Republican to Democratic

- Atlantic
- Bergen
- Burlington
- Camden
- Cape May
- Cumberland
- Essex
- Gloucester
- Hudson
- Mercer
- Middlesex
- Monmouth
- Ocean
- Passaic
- Salem
- Somerset
- Union
