= Thomas Hale Boggs Jr. =

American lawyer and lobbyist (1940–2014)

Tommy Boggs
- Born: September 18, 1940; New Orleans, Louisiana, U.S.
- Died: September 15, 2014 (aged 73); Chevy Chase, Maryland, U.S.
- Resting place: Congressional Cemetery, Washington, D.C., United States
- Education: Georgetown University Law Center
- Occupations: Lawyer, lobbyist
- Spouse: Barbara Denechaud Boggs
- Children: 3
- Parent(s): Hale Boggs; Lindy Boggs
- Relatives: Cokie Roberts (sister); Barbara Boggs Sigmund (sister); Rebecca Roberts (niece); Lee H. Roberts (nephew)

Thomas Hale Boggs Jr. (September 18, 1940 – September 15, 2014) was an American lawyer and lobbyist.

== Biography ==
Boggs was the son of Thomas Hale Boggs (1914–1972), a United States Representative from Louisiana's 2nd congressional district, and Lindy Boggs (1916–2013), her husband's successor in the 2nd congressional district and thereafter U.S. Ambassador to the Vatican under U.S. President Bill Clinton. His siblings included journalist and news commentator Cokie Roberts (1943–2019) and Barbara Boggs Sigmund (1939–1990), who served as the mayor of Princeton, New Jersey.

=== Lobbying career ===
Boggs, a Democrat, began his legal practice in New Orleans and later moved to Washington, D.C., to become a lawyer and lobbyist. He joined the law/lobbyist firm of James R. Patton Jr., which today is known as Squire Patton Boggs. Boggs was the firm's senior partner. With Patton Boggs, he was known for lobbying on major issues, including:

- Repealing the Glass-Steagall Act on behalf of the American Bankers Association
- Litigation against Chevron for environmental issues in Ecuador
- The $1.5 billion federal bailout of Chrysler in 1979

=== Political campaign ===
In 1970, Boggs unsuccessfully ran for the United States House of Representatives from Maryland's 8th congressional district against incumbent Republican Gilbert Gude.

=== Death and legacy ===
Boggs died of an apparent heart attack September 15, 2014, three days before his 74th birthday. He is interred at the historic Congressional Cemetery in Washington, D.C.
