= Paul H. Maloney =

American politician (1876–1967)

Paul Maloney
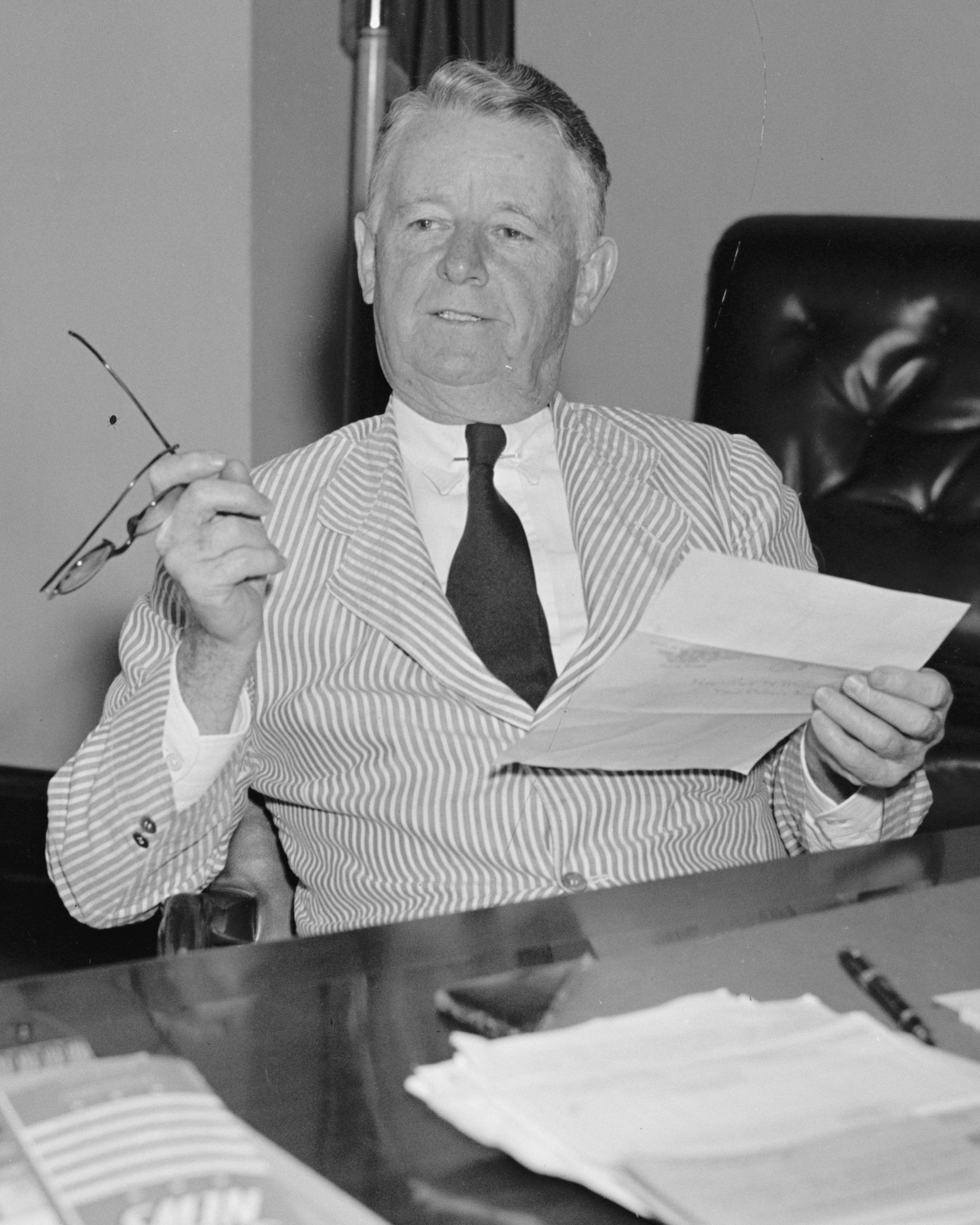
- Maloney in June 1940

Member of the U.S. House of Representatives from Louisiana's 2nd district
- In office January 3, 1943 – January 3, 1947
- Preceded by: Hale Boggs
- Succeeded by: Hale Boggs
- In office March 4, 1931 – December 15, 1940
- Preceded by: James Z. Spearing
- Succeeded by: Hale Boggs

Member of the Louisiana House of Representatives
- In office 1914 – 1916

Personal details
- Born: Paul Herbert Maloney; February 14, 1876 New Orleans, Louisiana
- Died: March 26, 1967 (aged 91) New Orleans, Louisiana
- Party: Democratic
- Spouse: Adeline LeCourt

Paul Herbert Maloney (February 14, 1876 – March 26, 1967) was a member of the Louisiana House of Representatives from 1914 to 1916. Later, he was a member of the U.S. House of Representatives representing the state of Louisiana. He served seven terms as a Democrat from 1931 to 1940 and from 1943 to 1947.

== Biography ==
Born in New Orleans, Maloney attended public school and private school in Pass Christian, Mississippi. He began employment as an office boy for a drayage company and served in the Louisiana National Guard from 1895 to 1898. By 1916, he was president of the drayage company while also engaging in a linen supply company, a trucking and storage company, and an automobile distributing company.

Maloney entered politics in 1914 when he was elected a member of the Louisiana House of Representatives. He joined the New Orleans Levee Board in 1917 and served as president in 1919 and 1920, and was commissioner of public utilities from 1920 to 1925. He was a delegate to the Democratic National Conventions from 1924 through 1936. Maloney successfully challenged Representative James Z. Spearing for renomination to Congress in 1930 and was elected five times. In 1940, facing a spirited challenge from anti-Longite attorney Hale Boggs, Maloney initially withdrew his bid for a sixth term, but reentered the race and subsequently lost to Boggs in a controversial election which would later become the subject of the Supreme Court case United States v. Classic. He was nominated and confirmed to become collector of internal revenue for the New Orleans district, serving from December 16, 1940, to July 31, 1942.

Maloney defeated Boggs for renomination in 1942 and was elected to two additional terms in Congress. He declined to seek reelection in 1946 and was again succeeded by Boggs. He resumed his business activities in the trucking and storage business.

=== Death ===
Maloney died in New Orleans on March 26, 1967, and was interred at Metairie Cemetery.

U.S. House of Representatives
Preceded by James Z. Spearing	Member of the U.S. House of Representatives from Louisiana's 2nd congressional district 1931 – 1940	Succeeded by Hale Boggs
Preceded by Hale Boggs	Member of the U.S. House of Representatives from Louisiana's 2nd congressional district 1943 – 1947	Succeeded by Hale Boggs
