= Samuel L. Gilmore =

American politician

Samuel Louis Gilmore
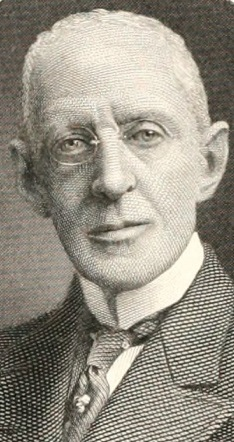
- Frontispiece of 1911's Samuel Louis Gilmore, Late a Representative from Louisiana

Member of the U.S. House of Representatives from Louisiana's 2nd district
- In office March 30, 1909 – July 18, 1910
- Preceded by: Robert C. Davey
- Succeeded by: H. Garland Dupré

Personal details
- Born: July 30, 1859 New Orleans, Louisiana
- Died: July 18, 1910 (aged 50) Abita Springs, Louisiana
- Resting place: Metairie Cemetery, New Orleans
- Party: Democratic
- Children: 2, including Martha Gilmore Robinson

Samuel Louis Gilmore (July 30, 1859 – July 18, 1910) was a U.S. representative from Louisiana.

Gilmore was born in New Orleans, Louisiana. He was instructed by private tutors, graduating from the Central High School of New Orleans in 1874, from Seton Hall College, South Orange, New Jersey, in 1877, and from the law department of the University of Louisiana (now Tulane University) at New Orleans in 1879. He was admitted to the bar in 1880 and commenced practice in New Orleans, Louisiana. From 1888 to 1896, Gilmore served as assistant city attorney. He was city attorney from 1896 until March 15, 1909, when he resigned. He served as delegate to the Democratic National Convention in 1908.

Gilmore was elected as a Democrat to the Sixty-first Congress to fill the vacancy caused by the death of Robert C. Davey and served from March 30, 1909, until his death in Abita Springs, Louisiana, on July 18, 1910. He was interred in Metairie Cemetery, New Orleans, Louisiana.

His daughter, Martha Gilmore Robinson, was a women's rights and civic activist. His son, Samuel Louis Gilmore, Jr., was a poet and playwright, as well as an associate editor for The Double Dealer.

== See also ==
- List of members of the United States Congress who died in office (1900–1949)

U.S. House of Representatives
Preceded by Robert C. Davey	Member of the U.S. House of Representatives from Louisiana's 2nd congressional district 1909–1910	Succeeded by H. Garland Dupré
