= Martha Gilmore Robinson =

American activist

Martha Gilmore Robinson (August 18, 1888 – February 5, 1981) was an American women's rights and civic activist, who founded the Silver Thimble Fund of America, the Woman Citizens' Union, co-founded the Louisiana Landmarks Society, and was president of Louisiana's League of Women Voters.

== Biography ==
Robinson was born in New Orleans, on August 18, 1888, the daughter of attorney and U.S. Representative Samuel Louis Gilmore, and his wife, Martha Frazier Nolan Gilmore. She was educated there at the Academy of the Sacred Heart, and at Sophie Newcomb College, from where she graduated in 1909.

She married Robert Gibson Robinson, a graduate of Princeton, and the owner of a successful lumber business. They had four sons and a daughter.
