= Academy of the Sacred Heart (New Orleans) =

Private Catholic high school in New Orleans, Louisiana

- "The Rosary"
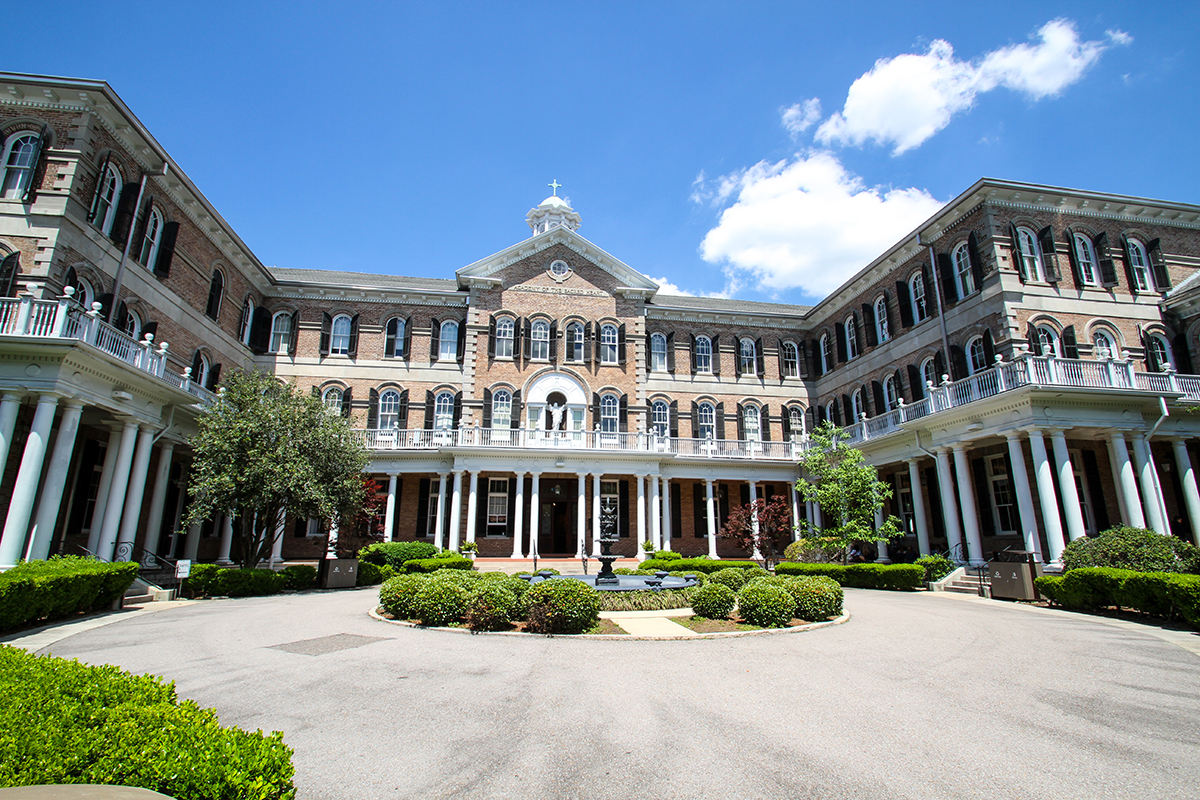
- Academy of the Sacred Heart

Location
- 4521 St. Charles Avenue; New Orleans, (Orleans Parish), Louisiana 70115; United States; 29°55′37″N 90°6′14″W

Information
- Type: Private
- Religious affiliation: Roman Catholic
- Established: 1867
- Founder: Saint Philippine Duchesne
- Upper School Division Head: Julie Boyd
- Head of school: Gretchen Kane
- Grades: Pre-K - 12 grade
- Gender: Girls
- Age range: Age 1-Grade 12
- Enrollment: 750
- Colors: Red and White
- Athletics conference: LHSAA
- Mascot: Cardinals
- Accreditation: ISASW
- Yearbook: Souvenons-Nous
- Tuition: $22,105 (2023-24, high school)
- Affiliation: Network of Sacred Heart Schools
- Dean of students: Nicole Janz (Middle Sch); Shannon Salmon (Upper Sch); Jennifer Adams (Lower Sch)
- Director of admission: Ashley Zito
- Director of athletics: Sue Bower
- Website: ashrosary.org

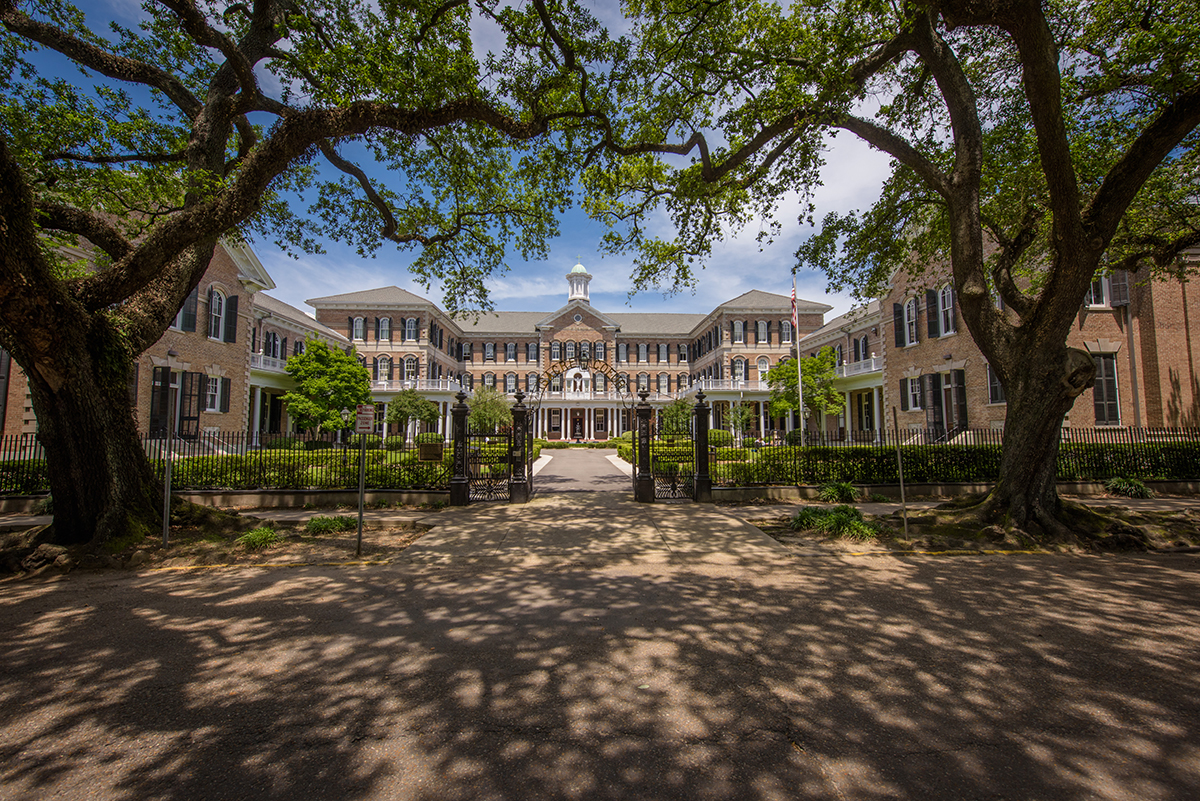
From the gates

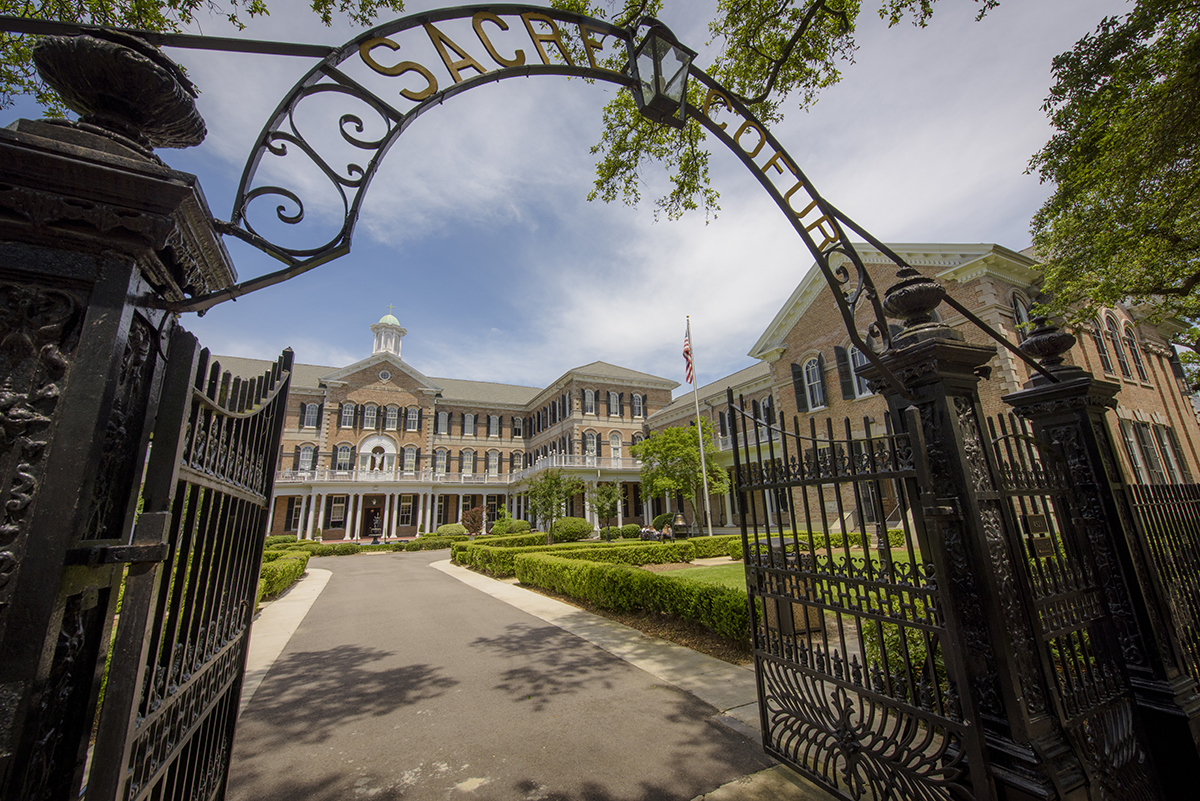
Gates and archway

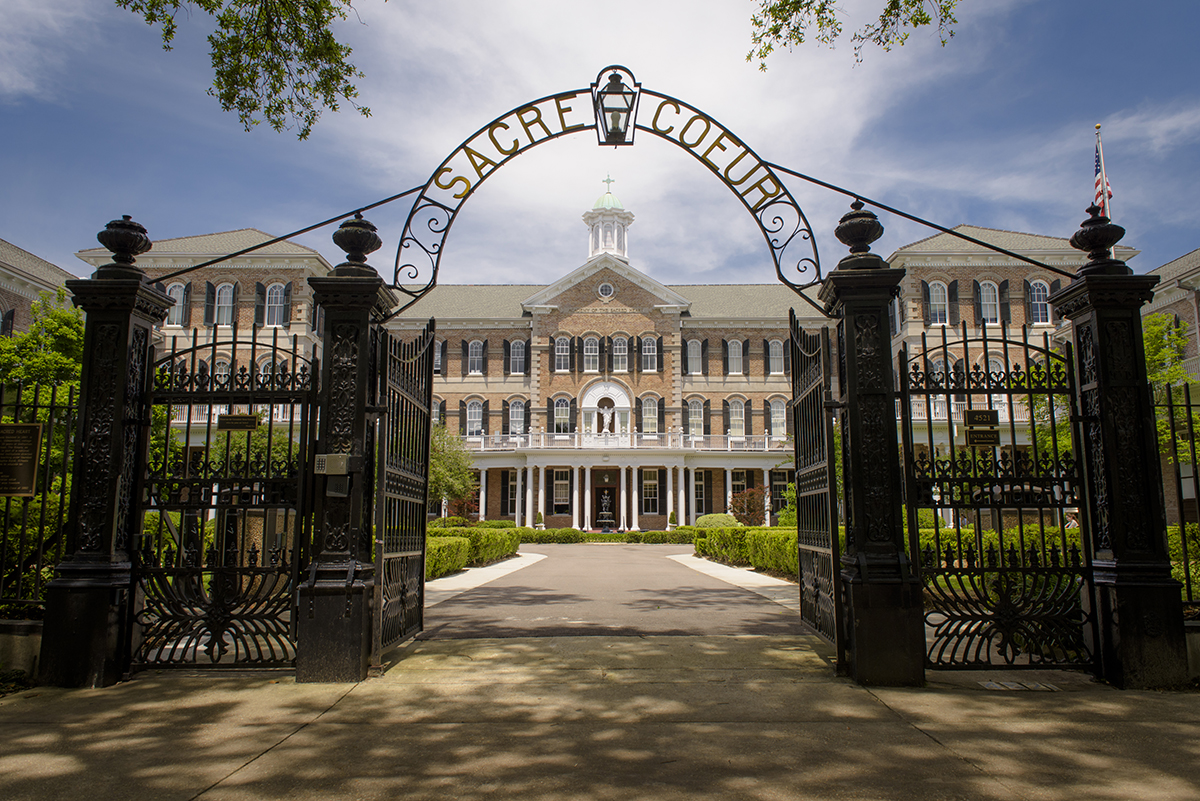
Gates and archway

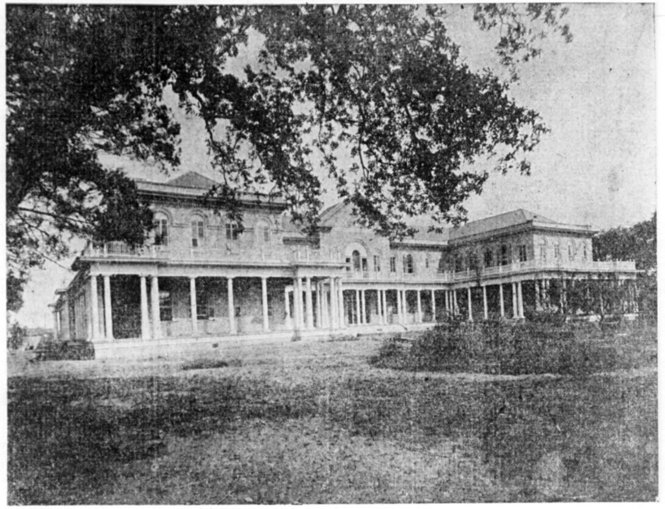
Convent of the Rosary, 1900

The Academy of the Sacred Heart is a private Catholic high school in New Orleans, Louisiana. It is located within the Archdiocese of New Orleans and was established in 1867 by the Society of the Sacred Heart.

== Athletics ==
Academy of the Sacred Heart athletics competes in the LHSAA.

== Alumnae ==
- Mignon Faget, jewelry designer based in her native New Orleans, Louisiana
- Lucy Faust, American actress
- Martha Gilmore Robinson, women's rights and civic activist
- Desirée Rogers, American corporate executive, former White House Social Secretary for President Barack Obama's office and chief executive officer of Johnson Publishing Company
- Cokie Roberts, American journalist and author
