= Stone Ridge School of the Sacred Heart =

Catholic school in Bethesda, Maryland, US

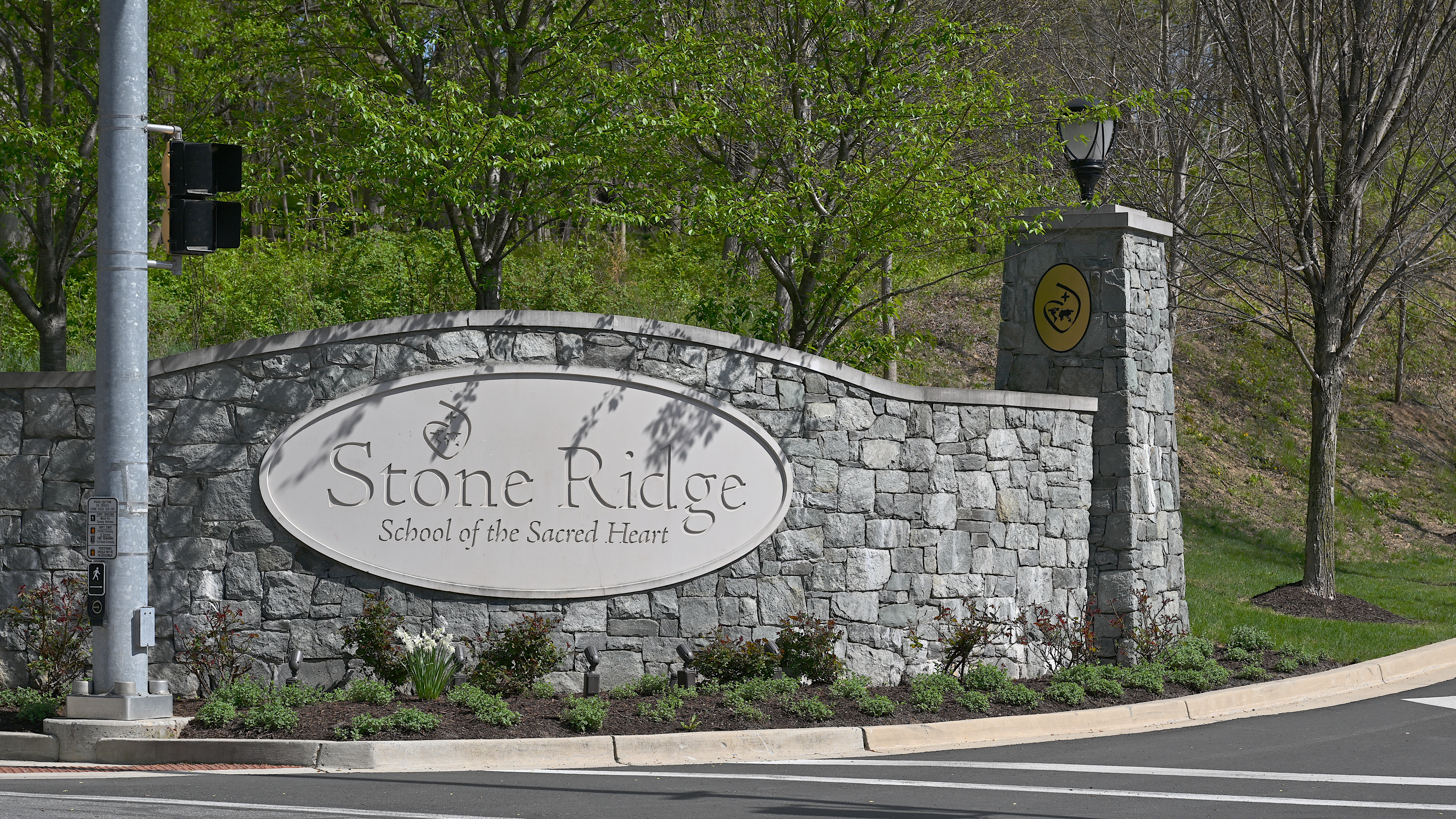

Location
- 9101 Rockville Pike; Bethesda, Maryland 20814; United States

Information
- Type: Private
- Motto: Hic et Nunc (Here and Now)
- Religious affiliation: Roman Catholic
- Established: 1924
- School district: Archdiocese of Washington Catholic Schools
- Head of School: Catherine Ronan Karrels
- Grades: Preschool–12
- Gender: Girls
- Colors: Blue and gold
- Song: Coeur de Jesus
- Athletics: Independent School League
- Accreditation: Middle States Association of Colleges and Schools
- Newspaper: The Here & Now
- Yearbook: Ridgeway
- Tuition: $44,900 grades 9-12
- Website: stoneridgeschool.org

Stone Ridge School of the Sacred Heart is a Catholic, independent, college preparatory school in Bethesda, Maryland. Founded in 1923, it is part of the Network of Sacred Heart schools for girls. The school is all-girls for grades 1-12 and has a co-educational PreKindergarten and Kindergarten.

== History ==
Stone Ridge was established in downtown Washington, DC at 1719 Massachusetts Avenue, NW in 1923. By the end of the Second World War, the school had outgrown the original building. In 1947, the Society of the Sacred Heart bought 25 acres and their estate, known as "Stone Ridge," in Bethesda, Maryland from Mr. and Mrs. George Hamilton. To this day, the original mansion of the Hamilton estate, a grand neo-Georgian edifice built in 1904, is known as "Hamilton House".

== Athletics ==
Stone Ridge girls compete athletically in the Independent School League. In 2015, a turf field was added to the campus. It is lined for field hockey, soccer and lacrosse.

== Campus ==
It hosts the classes of the Washington Japanese Language School (ワシントン日本語学校 Washington Nihongo Gakkō), a supplementary school for Japanese children subsidized by the Japanese government.

== Notable alumnae ==
- Andrea Koppel (1981)
- Cokie Roberts (1960)
- Maria Shriver (1973)
- Frederica von Stade (finished at Sacred Heart in Noroton, CT)
- Kathleen Kennedy Townsend (finished at The Putney School in Vermont)
- Katie Ledecky (2015)
- Erin Gemmell
- Phoebe Bacon (2020)

== See also ==
- Network of Sacred Heart Schools
- Madeleine Sophie Barat
- Philippine Duchesne
