= Cokie Roberts =

American journalist and author (1943–2019)

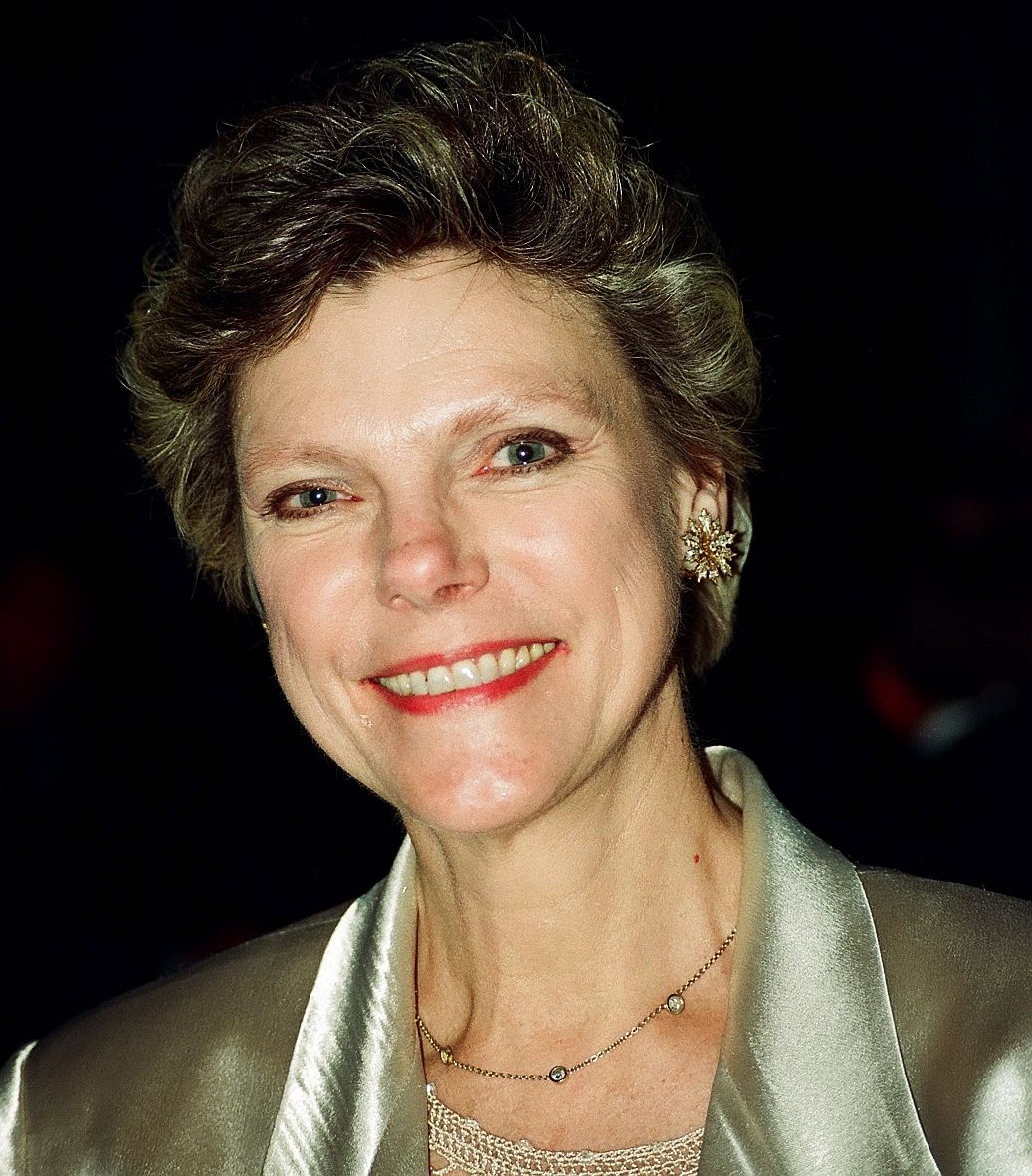
- Roberts in 1998
- Born: Mary Martha Corinne Morrison Claiborne Boggs; December 27, 1943; New Orleans, Louisiana, U.S.
- Died: September 17, 2019 (aged 75); Washington, D.C., U.S.
- Resting place: Congressional Cemetery
- Education: Wellesley College (BA)
- Occupations: Journalist, author
- Employer(s): NPR, ABC, PBS
- Known for: Journalist, author, pundit, television
- Title: Contributing Senior News Analyst
- Political party: Democratic
- Spouse: Steven V. Roberts (m. 1966)
- Children: Lee; Rebecca
- Parent(s): Hale Boggs; Lindy Boggs
- Relatives: Barbara Boggs Sigmund (sister); Tommy Boggs (brother)

Mary Martha Corinne Morrison Claiborne "Cokie" Roberts (née Boggs; December 27, 1943 – September 17, 2019) was an American journalist and author. Her career included decades as a political reporter and analyst for National Public Radio, PBS, and ABC News, with prominent positions on Morning Edition, The MacNeil/Lehrer NewsHour, World News Tonight, and This Week. She was considered one of NPR's "Founding Mothers" along with the late Susan Stamberg, Linda Wertheimer and Nina Totenberg.

Roberts, along with her husband, Steve, wrote a weekly column syndicated by United Media in newspapers around the United States. She served on the boards of several non-profit organizations such as the Kaiser Family Foundation and was appointed by President George W. Bush to his Council on Service and Civic Participation.

== Early life and education ==
Roberts was born in New Orleans. She received the nickname Cokie from her brother, Tommy, who as a child could not pronounce her given name, Corinne.

Her parents were Lindy Boggs and Hale Boggs, each of whom served for decades as Democratic members of the House of Representatives from Louisiana; Lindy succeeded Hale after his plane disappeared over Alaska in 1972. Cokie was their third child. Her sister Barbara became mayor of Princeton, New Jersey, and a candidate for the United States Senate. Her brother Tommy became a prominent attorney and lobbyist in Washington, D.C.

She attended the Academy of the Sacred Heart, an all-girls Roman Catholic high school in New Orleans, and graduated from the Stone Ridge School, an all-girls school outside Washington, D.C., in 1960. She graduated from Wellesley College in 1964, where she received a Bachelor of Arts in political science.

== Career ==
Roberts's first job in journalism was at WRC-TV in Washington, D.C., where she was host of its weekly public affairs program Meeting of the Minds. After moving with her husband Steve, also a journalist, to New York City, she found work in 1967 as a reporter for Cowles Communications. She worked briefly as a producer for WNEW-TV before Steve's career had them relocating to Los Angeles. She worked for Altman Productions and then for KNBC-TV as producer of the children's program Serendipity, which won a 1971 Los Angeles Area Emmy Award. She also moved with her husband to Greece, where she was a stringer for CBS News in Athens at the time of the terrorist assassination of the CIA Station Chief, Richard Welch on December 23, 1975, while her husband ran the New York Times bureau there.

Roberts began working for National Public Radio (NPR) in 1978, working as the congressional correspondent for more than 10 years. Because of her early involvement as a female journalist in the network at a time when women were not often involved in journalism at the highest levels, she has been called one of the "founding mothers of NPR." Roberts was a contributor to the Public Broadcasting Service (PBS) on the evening television news program The MacNeil/Lehrer NewsHour. Her coverage of the Iran–Contra Affair for that program won her the Edward Weintal Prize for Diplomatic Reporting in 1988. From 1981 to 1984, in addition to her work at NPR, she also cohosted The Lawmakers, a weekly public television program on Congress. Starting in 1992, Roberts served as a senior news analyst and commentator for NPR, primarily on the daily news program Morning Edition. In 1994, The New York Times credited her, along with NPR's Linda Wertheimer and Nina Totenberg, with transforming male-dominated Washington, D.C., political journalism.

Roberts went to work for ABC News in 1988 as a political correspondent for ABC's World News Tonight with Peter Jennings, continuing to serve part-time as a political commentator at NPR. She appeared as a panelist for many years on ABC News' Sunday morning broadcast This Week with David Brinkley. After Brinkley's retirement, she co-anchored the program with Sam Donaldson (renamed This Week with Sam Donaldson & Cokie Roberts) from 1996 to 2002, while serving as the chief congressional analyst for ABC News. The two were replaced as anchors in September 2002 by George Stephanopoulos. She also covered politics, Congress, and public policy while reporting for World News Tonight and other ABC News broadcasts. Roberts continued to serve occasionally as a panelist on This Week and work on NPR. Her final assignment with NPR was a series of segments on Morning Edition titled "Ask Cokie," in which she answered questions submitted by listeners about subjects usually related to U.S. politics.

== Reporting on Dianna Ortiz case ==
In 1989, Sister Dianna Ortiz, a Catholic nun from New Mexico, was abducted, raped, and tortured while working in Guatemala by members of a Guatemalan government-backed death squad. Her abductors believed Ortiz was a subversive. During a subsequent interview, Roberts contested Ortiz's claim that an American was among her captors. (The United States provided significant military aid to Guatemala at the time.) Roberts implied that Ortiz was lying about the entire episode, although Ortiz later won a lawsuit against a Guatemalan general she accused in the case. It was later revealed that Patton Boggs, the law firm of Roberts's brother Tommy, was paid by the Guatemalan government to promote a more positive image of the regime, which was widely criticized internationally for human rights abuses.

== Awards and honors ==
Roberts won the Edward R. Murrow Award, the Everett McKinley Dirksen Award for coverage of Congress, and a 1991 Emmy Award for her contribution to Who Is Ross Perot? In 1997, she received the Golden Plate Award of the American Academy of Achievement presented by Awards Council member Sam Donaldson. In 2000, she won the Walter Cronkite Award for Excellence in Journalism.

Roberts and her mother, Lindy Boggs, won the Foremother Award from the National Center for Health Research in 2013.

She was made an honoris causa initiate of Omicron Delta Kappa in 1995 from the University of Akron and later received the organization's highest honor, the Laurel Crowned Circle. Roberts was also inducted into the Broadcasting & Cable Hall of Fame in 2000. She was also cited as one of the 50 greatest women in the history of broadcasting by the American Women in Radio and Television.

Roberts was a president of the Radio and Television Correspondents' Association.

== Personal life and death ==
External videos
- Funeral Mass for Cokie Roberts, September 21, 2019, C-SPAN

From 1966 until her death, Roberts was married to Steven V. Roberts, a professor and fellow journalist. They met in summer 1962, when she was 18 and he was 19. They resided in Bethesda, Maryland. They had two children: a son, Lee, and a daughter, Rebecca. Roberts was a Roman Catholic.

In 2002, Roberts was diagnosed with metastatic breast cancer. She was successfully treated at the time but died from complications of the disease in Washington, D.C., on September 17, 2019.

== Works ==
- We Are Our Mothers' Daughters: Revised and Expanded Edition. HarperCollins. 1998. ISBN 978-0-06-187235-8. Essays
- Cokie Roberts; Steven V. Roberts (2000). From This Day Forward. HarperCollins. ISBN 978-0-06-186752-1.
- Founding Mothers: The Women Who Raised Our Nation. HarperCollins. 2004. ISBN 978-0-06-009025-8. The book explores the lives of the women behind the men who wrote the Constitution of the United States and the Declaration of Independence.
- Ladies of Liberty. HarperCollins. 2009. ISBN 978-0-06-173721-3. Continues the story of early America's influential women who shaped the U.S. during its early stages, chronicling their public roles and private responsibilities.
- Cokie Roberts; Steven V. Roberts (2011). Our Haggadah: Uniting Traditions for Interfaith Families. HarperCollins. ISBN 978-0-06-207465-2.
- Capital Dames: The Civil War and the Women of Washington, 1848–1868. HarperCollins. 2015. ISBN 978-0-06-200276-1. Stories about the formidable women of Washington, D.C. during the Civil War.

== External sources ==
- Appearances on C-SPAN
- Official biography—NPR
- Recent NPR stories by Cokie Roberts (2009)—NPR
- Video Interviews with Cokie Roberts—Charlie Rose
- Women of Influence—National Endowment for the Humanities
- 1994 commencement speech; —Wellesley College
- Oral History of the U.S. House of Representatives; —Cokie Roberts gives a first-hand account of growing up in the capital
- Cokie Roberts at The Interviews: An Oral History of Television
- Remembering Cokie Roberts, 1943–2019—NPR memorial page, including the NPR special
- Cokie Roberts at Find a Grave

Media offices
Preceded by David Brinkley	This Week co-anchor with Sam Donaldson; December 15, 1996 – September 8, 2002	Succeeded by George Stephanopoulos
