= War Memorial Shelters =

Two Grade II listed shelters in London

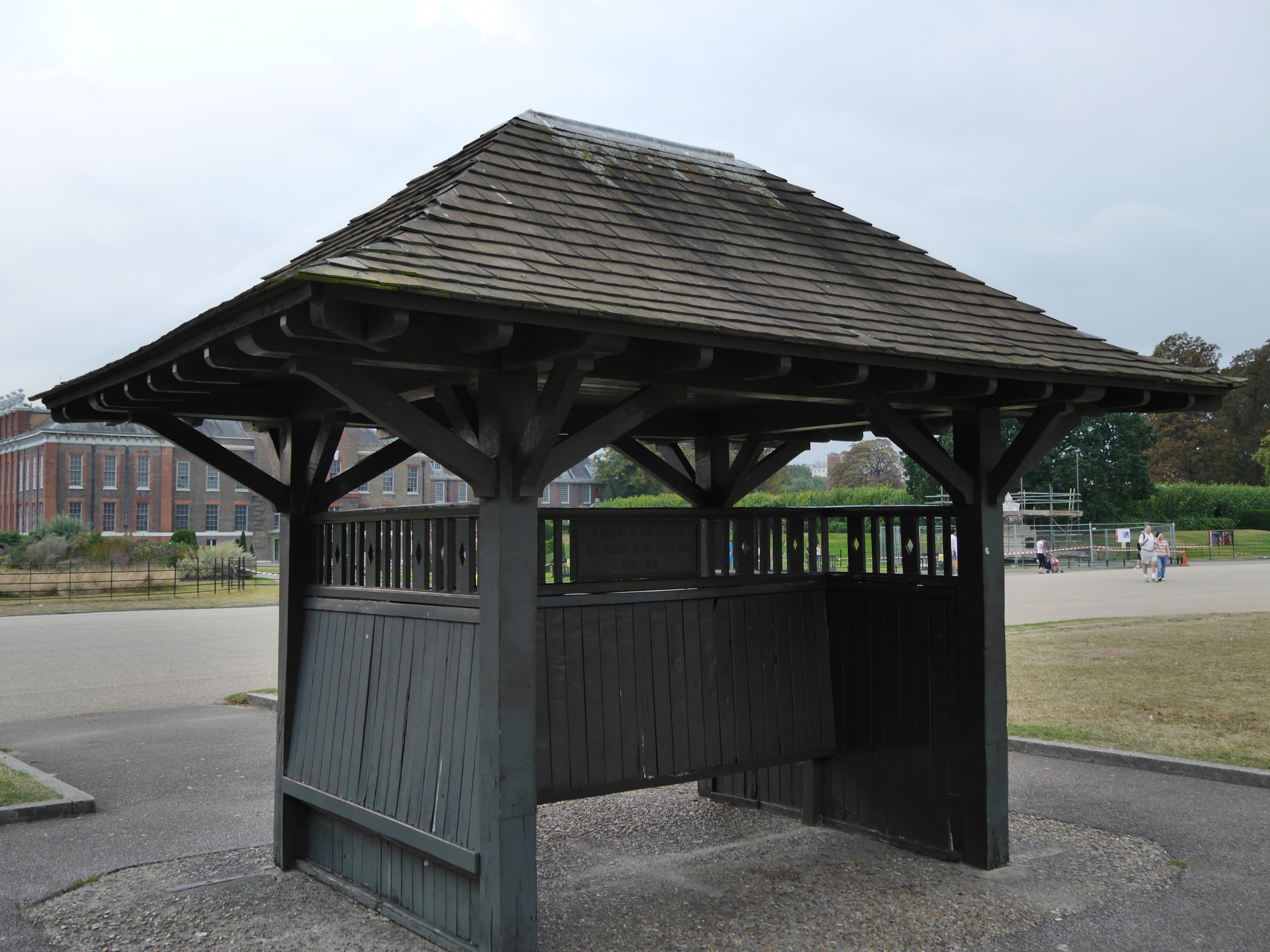
- The southernmost War Memorial Shelter, 2016

General information
- Location: Kensington Gardens, London, England
- Coordinates: 51.505927°N 0.185755°W

Design and construction
- Known for: Built by the Silver Thimble Fund to commemorate the Great War

The War Memorial Shelters are two Grade II listed commemorative shelters in Kensington Gardens, London, about 100m apart, and about 140m east of Kensington Palace, built in about 1919 by the Silver Thimble Fund, to commemorate the Great War, and the soldiers and sailors who fought.

The seating inside them was removed in 2013, and they were listed in 2014.
