= Silver Thimble Fund =

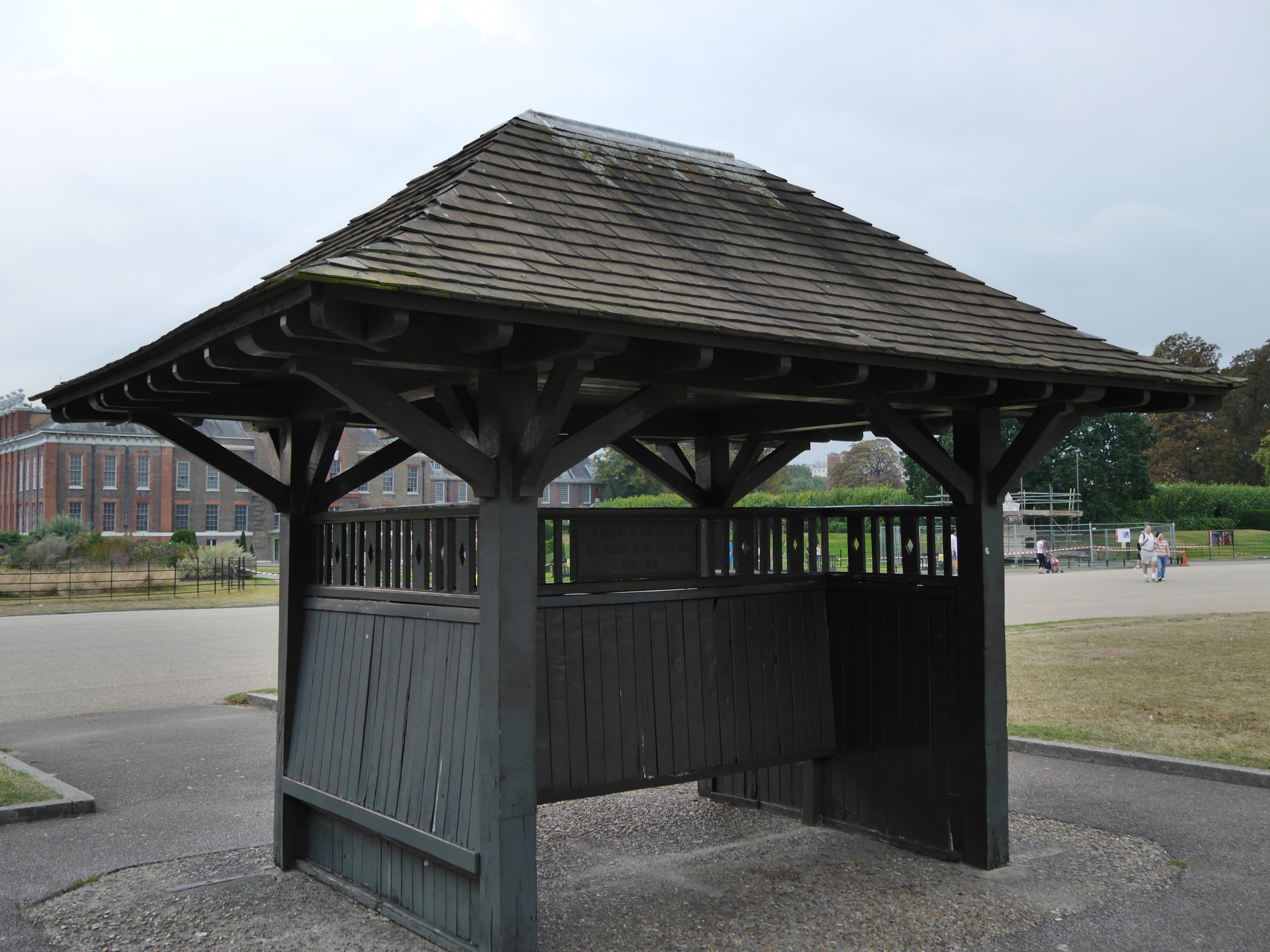
The southernmost of the War Memorial Shelters, built with money raised by the Silver Thimble Fund

The Silver Thimble Fund was founded by Miss Hope Elizabeth Hope-Clarke of Wimbledon in 1915 to collect damaged thimbles and other items made from precious metals, melt them down and raise money for medical equipment. It became "one of the most successful charities of the First World War".

Hope-Clarke started with a letter in The Times in July 1915, appealing for damaged thimbles and other trinkets. The Silver Thimble Fund was run from her house in Wimbledon throughout the War, and Queen Alexandra (the King's mother) became the charity's patron.

By 1919, 30 appeals resulted in 60,000 thimbles being collected. The Fund acquired 15 ambulances, 5 motor hospital launches, 2 dental surgery cars and a disinfector, and 160 collecting centres were established across the Commonwealth.

The War Memorial Shelters are two Grade II listed commemorative shelters in Kensington Gardens, London, about 140m east of Kensington Palace, built in about 1919 by the Silver Thimble Fund, to commemorate the Great War, and the soldiers and sailors who fought.
