= Lea Roberts =

British comedian

- Born: Ian Lea Roberts; 29 July 1966 (age 58); Halifax UK
- Occupation: Comedian
- Spouse: Sally Roberts
- Children: 3
- Website: www.learoberts.co.uk

Ian Lea Roberts (born 29 July 1966) is a stand-up comedian and after-dinner speaker. He rose to fame after becoming the outright winner of the ITV1 show Stand Up Britain in 2002. Lea had previously been runner-up of the Bachelors "Cup A Soup Comedy Challenge", which saw him perform at The Comedy Store, London. He then went on to appear on a number of TV shows, including the three-part series That's Entertainment for ITV, whilst increasing his name on the comedy circuit.

In previous years Lea has played professional rugby league for Halifax RLFC and is therefore passionate about sport as well as comedy.
