= Lee H. Roberts =

American university chancellor (born 1968)

- Roberts in 2026

13th Chancellor of the University of North Carolina at Chapel Hill
- Incumbent
- Assumed office January 12, 2024; Interim: January 12, 2024 – August 9, 2024
- Preceded by: Kevin Guskiewicz

Personal details
- Born: Lee Harriss Roberts; 1968 (age 57–58)
- Education: Duke University (BA); Georgetown University (JD)
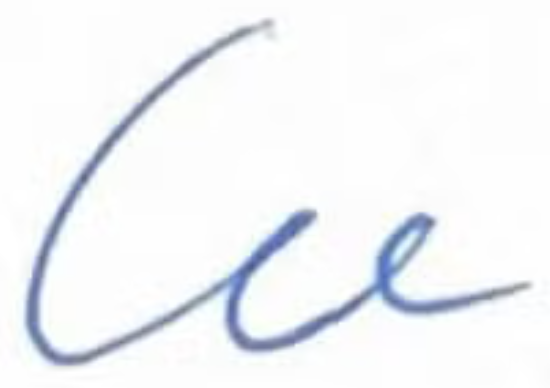
- Signature

Lee Harriss Roberts is the 13th chancellor of the University of North Carolina at Chapel Hill since January 2024. Before the chancellorship, he spent 30 years working in the finance industry.

== Early life and education ==
Roberts was born to journalists Steven and Cokie Roberts. His mother was the daughter of Hale and Lindy Boggs. He grew up in Washington, D.C.

Roberts received a Bachelor of Arts degree with a major in political science from Duke University in 1990 and a Juris Doctor degree from Georgetown University in 1994.

== Finance career ==
Roberts spent 30 years working in the finance industry. He was a partner at Cherokee Investment Partners and spent nine years with Morgan Stanley, where, among other projects, he helped guide financing for the $1.6 billion Africa ONE fiber network, the $2.2 billion Mumbai Trans Harbour Link, and the $5 billion World Trade Center site redevelopment. He then became managing director of Piedmont Community Bank Holdings. From 2014 to 2016, he was the budget director for then-Governor of North Carolina Pat McCrory, where his office oversaw more than $40 billion in spending. Upon Roberts' departure, McCrory awarded him the Order of the Long Leaf Pine.

In 2016, Roberts founded SharpVue Capital, a private investment firm in Raleigh, North Carolina. From 2019 to 2024, he taught budgeting as an adjunct instructor at the Sanford School of Public Policy of Duke University.

In 2019, Roberts was appointed to the corporate board of Variety Wholesalers, a retail-store company owned by Art Pope, a prominent conservative donor.

From 2021 to 2024, Roberts served as member of the University of North Carolina Board of Governors and chair of its budget committee.

== UNC Chapel Hill ==
=== Appointment ===
On December 15, 2023, the University of North Carolina at Chapel Hill announced that Roberts would succeed then chancellor Kevin Guskiewicz (who left to serve as the 22nd president of Michigan State University) as the interim chancellor of UNC Chapel Hill.

On August 9, 2024, the UNC System Board of Governors appointed Roberts as the 13th chancellor and 31st leader of UNC Chapel Hill after serving 7 months as interim chancellor.

=== Response to appointment ===
The selection process for Roberts' appointment faced criticism from members of the student body and faculty.

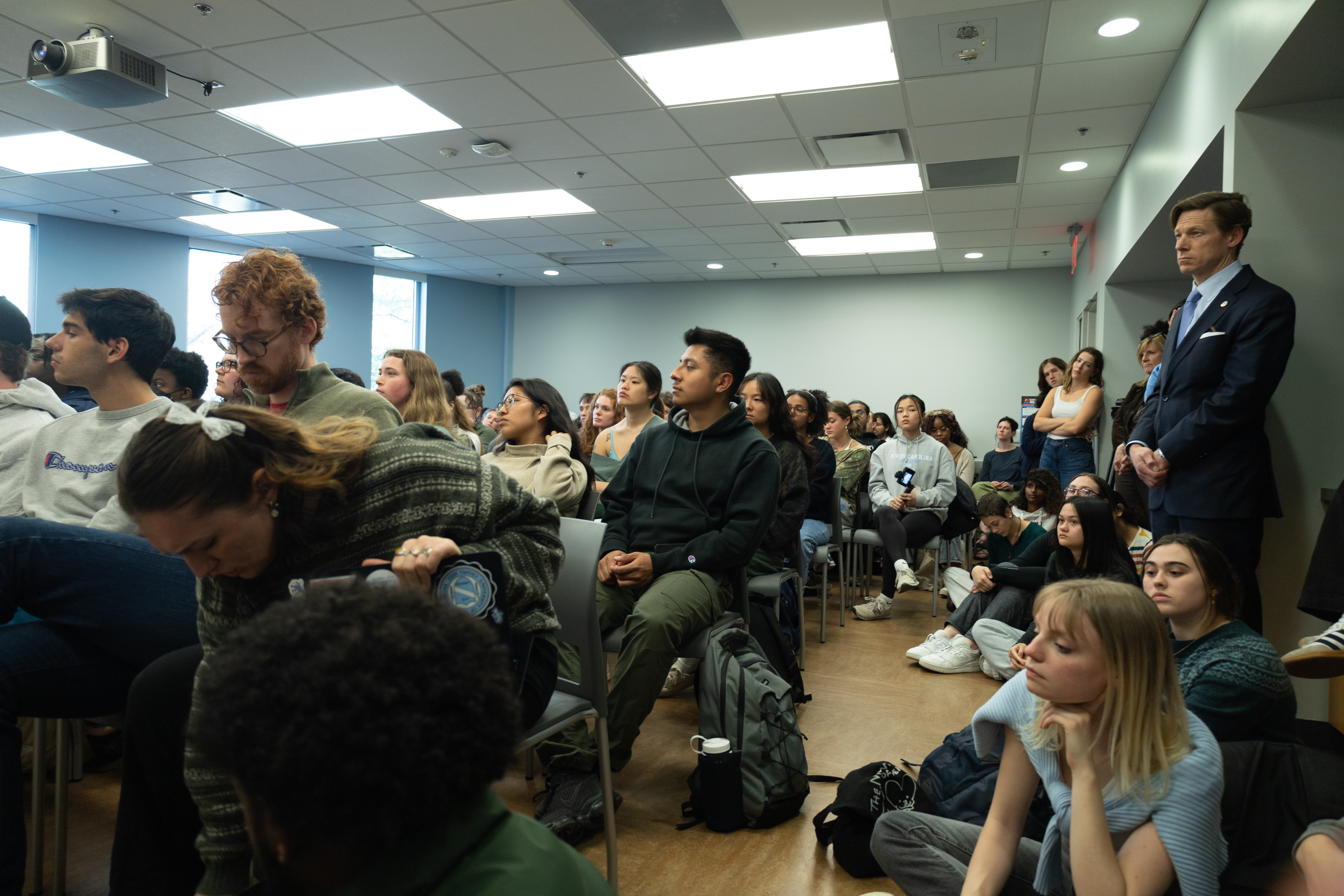
Lee Roberts (right) makes an impromptu appearance at the TransparUNCy Teach-in: Part 2 on April 4th, 2024

On January 12, 2024, the university's student newspaper The Daily Tar Heel published an op-ed titled "UNC deserves better, Lee Roberts ain't it" authored by a coalition of student groups. The article highlighted Roberts' lack of experience in educational administration and actions during his tenure as state budget director that were perceived as contrary to the interests of higher education and inclusivity.

A month later, in February 2024, The Daily Tar Heel published another op-ed authored by five UNC students, titled "'Nonpartisan' Lee Roberts receives income from far-right megadonor's company" highlighting a conflict between his claimed commitment nonpartisanship and his financial ties to conservative donor Art Pope. Following this publication, Roberts stated in an interview that he would not be taking income from his board position on Art Pope's company Variety Wholesalers during his time as interim chancellor, and that serving on a corporate board has no bearing on his nonpartisanship.

In early April 2024, a student group was formed in opposition to Roberts' chancellorship, TransparUNCy. Alexander Denza, a UNC student activist and TransparUNCy organizer, questioned the motivations behind accelerated timeline of the search, which was initially expected to conclude by the end of the year. At a TransparUNCy meeting session in April 2024, Roberts made an appearance where he reaffirmed his commitment to nonpartisanship to the crowd.

On May 11 during the 2024 spring commencement ceremony, students walked towards the stage holding Palestinian flags and were escorted out by the police. During the ceremony, a Pro-Palestine student-led protest occurred at the South Building on Campus. One student leader said the protest was "to commemorate suspended seniors who were involved in the Triangle Gaza Solidarity Encampment." As part of this protest, red paint was poured on the steps of the South Building and red handprints were pressed on the outside of the building. A handwritten poster on the doors of the south building contained the words, " On a monumental & historic day, our chancellor has shown his true colors. Rather than support the student body, he supports genocide." In response to the protests, Roberts said "We not only support student protest, we actively encourage it." and followed asking those involved to refrain from vandalising buildings and harassing other students. During protests on campus, demonstrators later withdrew their earlier agreement to adhere to University policies.

Faculty members also expressed concerns regarding his chancellorship. Sue Estroff, a member of the UNC Faculty Executive Committee, stated weeks before the official appointment of Roberts, "I fear that the chancellor search is already over, and I don't have a lot of confidence in the process." Nearly 900 faculty and staff members addressed a joint letter to administrators criticizing the "militarized and unsafe climate" on campus.

=== During chancellorship ===
Roberts has led initiatives to expand student enrollment and advance development of Carolina North, a 250-acre site for new academic and athletic facilities.

On April 30, 2024, pro-Palestinian protesters removed the American flag from the UNC-Chapel Hill quad and replaced it with a Palestinian flag. Interim Chancellor Lee Roberts went to the quad and restored the U.S. flag on the central campus flagpole. Shortly afterward, a decision was made to take the flag back down and place it in storage. The flagpole remained empty, and many of the protesters left the area.

On December 11, 2024, Roberts and the university's athletic director Bubba Cunningham announced that Bill Belichick had been hired on a five-year contract for a head coaching job at the university.

On January 24, 2025, early in the second Trump administration, Roberts attended a Faculty Council Meeting at which he was asked by Allison Schlobohm (then-clinical associate professor of management and corporate communication at the UNC business school) how the university would respond to changes in immigration law. "I would just like to know," Schlobohm said, "if we're asked to identify undocumented students, what will we say?" Roberts replied: "If we're asked by law enforcement, we're going to comply with any requests from law enforcement about that or anything else."

On February 5, 2025, approximately 150 students and staff gathered to protest Roberts' response to the question outside of the South Building. The protest was organized, in part, by TransparUNCy. It featured music and cultural heritage celebrations from Mexico and Central America.

In 2025, the University announced plans to reduce approximately $70 million in expenses (roughly 2 percent of its operating budget) over the next two fiscal years in anticipation of decreased federal and state funding.

== Personal life ==
Lee H. Roberts is married to Liza Roberts, a journalist and founding editor of Walter Magazine, a monthly publication based in Raleigh, North Carolina. The couple met in 1985 when they were both Congressional pages. They married in 1997. They have three children together.
