= Steven V. Roberts =

American journalist (born 1943)

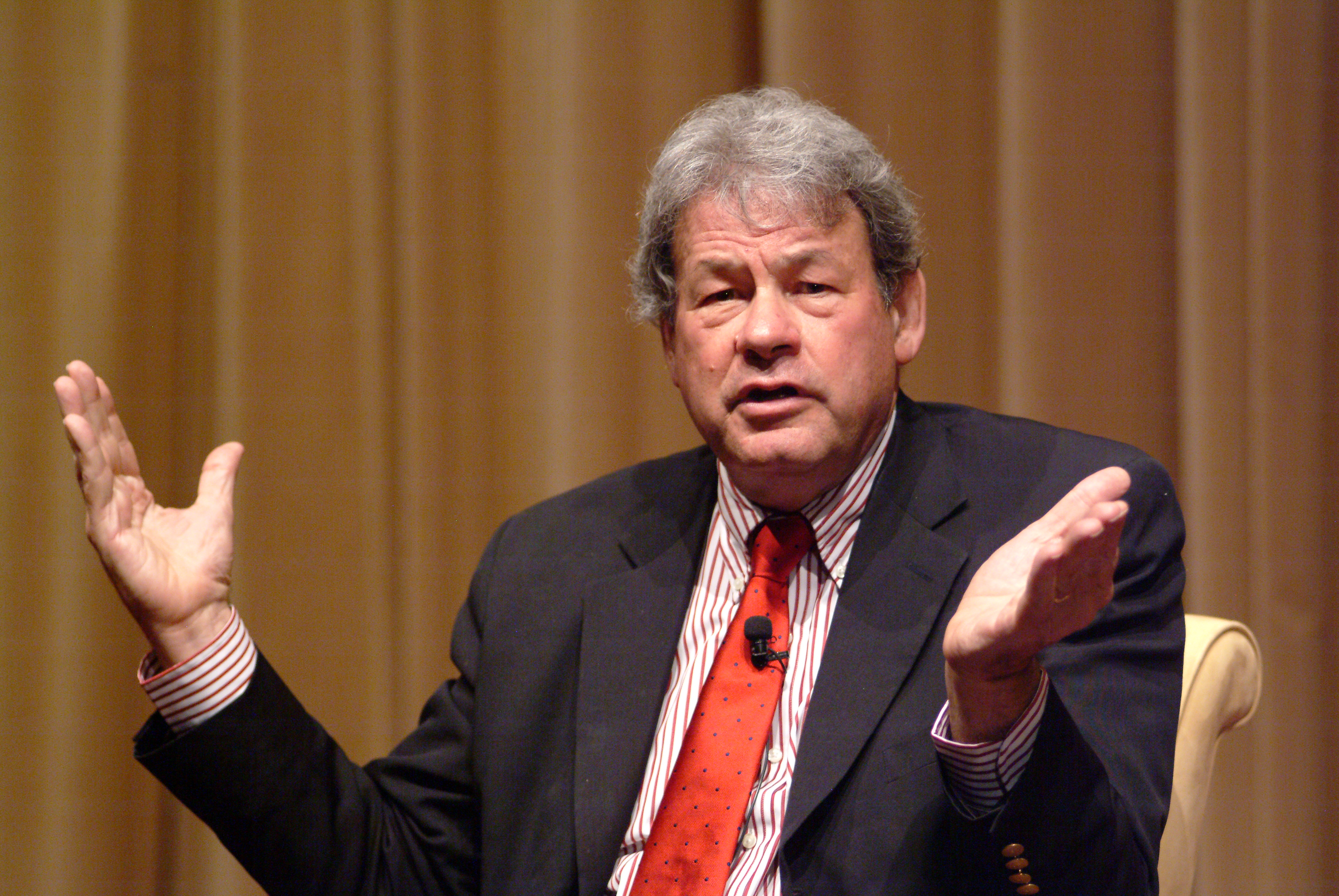
- Roberts in 2010
- Born: February 11, 1943 (age 83); Bayonne, New Jersey, U.S.
- Education: Harvard University (BA)
- Occupations: journalist, writer, political commentator
- Spouse: Cokie Roberts (m. 1966; died 2019)
- Children: Lee Roberts; Rebecca Roberts

Steven V. Roberts (born February 11, 1943) is an American journalist, writer, and political commentator.

== Life and career ==
Roberts was born in Bayonne, New Jersey, and graduated from Bayonne High School. He attended Harvard University, where he served as a staff member of the student newspaper, The Harvard Crimson. After graduating with a B.A. in Government in 1964, Roberts was hired by The New York Times as research assistant to James Reston, then the paper's Washington, D.C. bureau chief. He was a senior writer at U.S. News & World Report for seven years, and later a contributing editor. As a Washington pundit, Roberts appears regularly on ABC Radio, Washington Week in Review, CNN, Hardball with Chris Matthews. He often filled in as substitute host of The Diane Rehm Show on NPR (National Public Radio). He also appears regularly on America Abroad. Roberts has taught journalism and political communication at The George Washington University's School of Media and Public Affairs since 1997.

Roberts and his late wife, Cokie Roberts, wrote a nationally syndicated newspaper column and were contributing writers for USA Weekend, a Sunday magazine that appears in 500 newspapers nationwide. In February 2000, they jointly published From This Day Forward. They had two children, Lee and Rebecca, and six grandchildren.

== Books ==
- Cokie: A Life Well Lived (ISBN 978-0-06-285147-5) is Steve's 2021 tribute about Cokie and her legacy.
- Our Haggadah: Uniting Traditions for Interfaith Families (ISBN 978-0062018106) is his 2011 book co-authored with his wife, Cokie Roberts.
- From Every End of This Earth: 13 Families and the New Lives They Made in America, 2009.
- My Fathers' Houses, 2005.
- From This Day Forward, (with Cokie Roberts), Morrow, 2000.

== Sources ==
- Steve Roberts bio from George Washington University
