= Hale Boggs =

American politician (1914–1972)

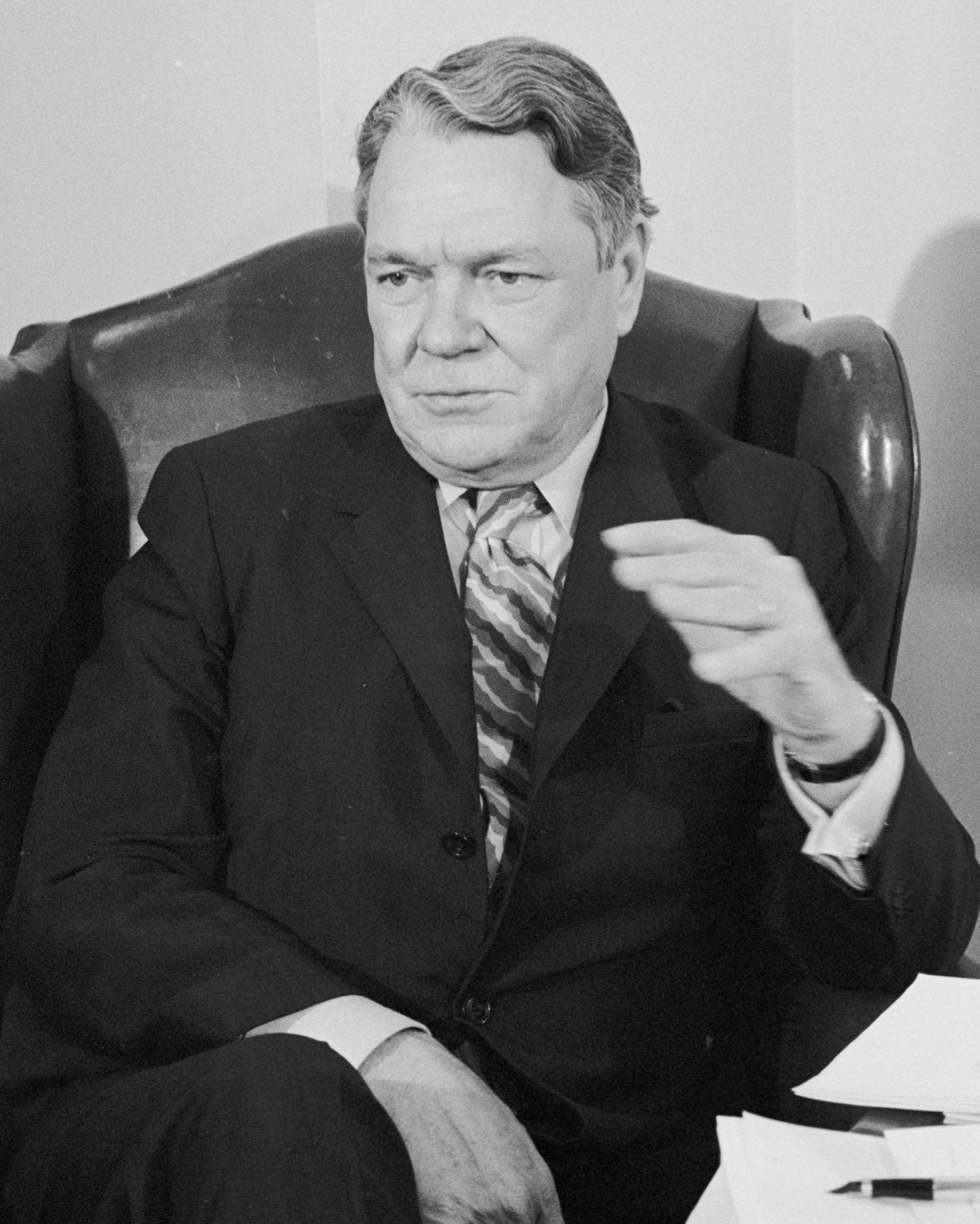
- Boggs in March 1971

House Majority Leader
- In office January 3, 1971 – January 3, 1973 (Note: As Boggs was missing and not officially declared dead in Congress until January, he formally retained an office after his disappearance.)
- Deputy: Tip O'Neill
- Speaker: Carl Albert
- Preceded by: Carl Albert
- Succeeded by: Tip O'Neill

House Majority Whip
- In office January 10, 1962 – January 3, 1971
- Leader: Carl Albert
- Preceded by: Carl Albert
- Succeeded by: Tip O'Neill

Member of the U.S. House of Representatives from Louisiana's 2nd district
- In office January 3, 1947 – January 3, 1973
- Preceded by: Paul H. Maloney
- Succeeded by: Lindy Boggs
- In office January 3, 1941 – January 3, 1943
- Preceded by: Paul H. Maloney
- Succeeded by: Paul H. Maloney

Personal details
- Born: Thomas Hale Boggs; February 15, 1914 Long Beach, Mississippi, U.S.
- Died: On or after October 16, 1972 (aged 58) Alaska, U.S.
- Party: Democratic
- Spouse: Lindy Claiborne (m. 1938)
- Children: 4, including Barbara, Tommy, and Cokie
- Education: Tulane University (BA, LLB)

Military service
- Allegiance: United States
- Branch/service: United States Navy
- Years of service: 1943–1946
- Rank: Ensign
- Battles/wars: World War II
- Disappeared: October 16, 1972 (aged 58); Alaska, U.S.
- Status: Declared dead in absentia December 29, 1972 (aged 58)

Thomas Hale Boggs Sr. (February 15, 1914 – disappeared October 16, 1972; declared dead December 29, 1972) was an American Democratic Party politician and a member of the U.S. House of Representatives from New Orleans, Louisiana. He was the House majority leader and a member of the Warren Commission.

In 1972, while still majority leader, Boggs was on a fundraising drive in Alaska when the twin engine airplane on which he was travelling along with Alaska congressman Nick Begich and two others disappeared en route from Anchorage to Juneau, Alaska.

== Early life and education ==
Boggs was born in Long Beach in Harrison County on the Mississippi Gulf Coast, the son of Claire Josephine (Hale) and William Robertson "Will" Boggs. Boggs was educated at Tulane University where he received a bachelor's degree in journalism in 1934 and a law degree in 1937. He first practiced law in New Orleans but soon became a leader in the movement to break the power of the political machine of U.S. Senator Huey Long, who was assassinated in 1935. Long had previously broken the power of New Orleans politicians in 1929.

== Career ==
=== U.S. House ===
A Democrat running as an anti-Long candidate in the 2nd congressional district, Boggs defeated incumbent Paul H. Maloney in the 1940 Democratic primary and won the general election unopposed. When he was sworn in he was, at 27, the youngest member of Congress.

His initial election was not without controversy; five of his political allies who served as Orleans Parish election commissioners were convicted of changing 97 votes for Boggs's Democratic primary opponents into votes for Boggs. The case, United States v. Classic, reached the Supreme Court, where it established the federal government's authority to regulate local primary elections, setting a key precedent for later civil rights decisions.

After an unsuccessful bid for renomination in 1942 against his predecessor Paul Maloney, Boggs enlisted in the United States Naval Reserve in November 1943, was commissioned an ensign, and served with the Potomac River Naval Command and the United States Maritime Service until January 1946.

=== Gubernatorial bid ===
After the war, Boggs began his political comeback. He was again elected to Congress in 1946 (on Maloney's retirement) and was then re-elected thirteen times, once just after he disappeared, but before he was presumed dead. In 1951, Boggs launched an ill-fated campaign for governor of Louisiana. Leading in the polls early in the campaign, he was soon put on the defensive when another candidate, Lucille May Grace, at the urging of long-time southeastern Louisiana political boss Leander Perez, questioned Boggs's membership in the American Student Union in the 1930s. By 1951, the ASU was thought to be a Communist front. Boggs avoided the question and attacked both Grace and Perez for conducting a smear campaign against him. In his book, The Big Lie, author Garry Boulard suggests strongly that Boggs was a member of the ASU but tried to cover up that fact in the different political climate of the early 1950s.

The Boggs Act of 1952, sponsored by Hale Boggs, set harsh mandatory sentences for drug-related offenses. A first-offense conviction for marijuana possession carried a minimum sentence of 2 to 10 years with a fine of up to $20,000.

=== Later House elections ===
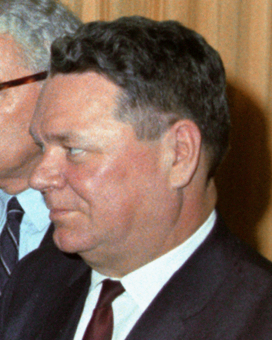
Boggs at the White House on September 24, 1964, as a member of the Warren Commission, presenting their report on the assassination of President John F. Kennedy to President Lyndon Johnson

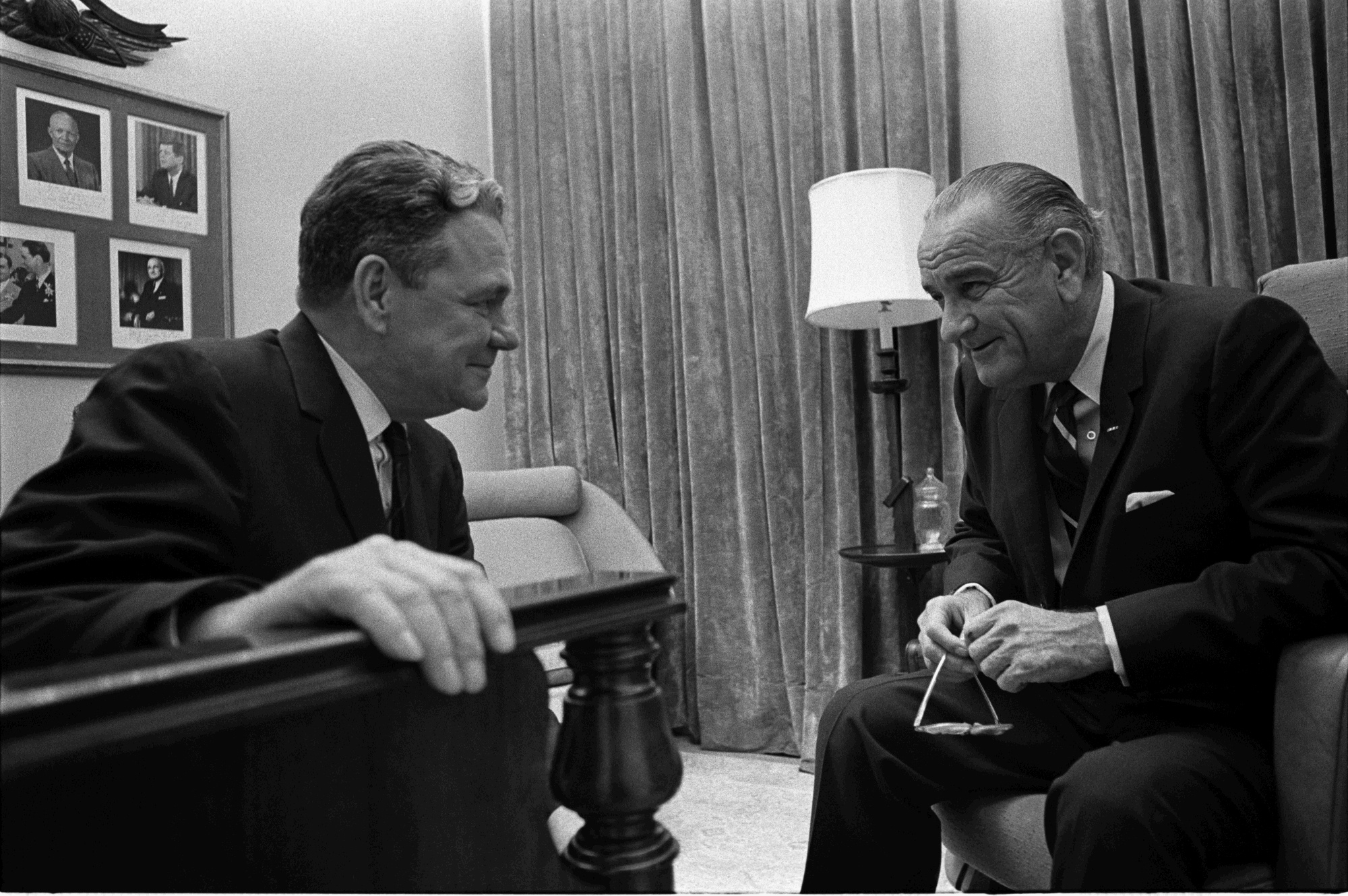
President Lyndon B. Johnson with House Majority Whip Boggs in May 1968

During his tenure in Congress, Boggs was an influential member. After the Brown v. Board of Education decision, he signed the 1956 Southern Manifesto condemning desegregation. Boggs voted against the Civil Rights Acts of 1957, 1960 and 1964, but voted in favor of the Voting Rights Act of 1965 and the Civil Rights Act of 1968. He was instrumental in passage of the interstate highway program in 1956.

Boggs was the youngest member of the Warren Commission, which, from 1963 to 1964, investigated the assassination of John F. Kennedy. Boggs has been reported to have differing positions regarding the Warren report. Based upon Office of the House Historian and Clerk of the House Office of Art and Archives, Politico reports that "Boggs dissented from the commission's majority report which supported the single bullet thesis — pointing to a lone assassin. Boggs said he "had strong doubts about it". He privately stated that FBI director J. Edgar Hoover "lied his eyes out to the Commission, on Oswald, on Ruby, on their friends, the bullet the gun, you name it". However in a 1966 appearance on Face the Nation, Boggs defended the commission's findings and stated that he did not doubt that Lee Harvey Oswald killed Kennedy. He said that all the evidence indicated that Kennedy was shot from behind and that the argument that one bullet hit both Kennedy and Texas Governor John Connally was "very persuasive". Boggs took issue with the assertions of Warren Commission critics and stated that it was "human nature" that "many people would prefer to believe there was a conspiracy". Boggs' son, Thomas Hale Boggs Jr., later stated that his father had shown him dossiers compiled by the FBI on Warren Commission critics in order to discredit them. It is unknown why his position was stated in such opposite terms, but conspiracy theorists have pondered that difference as significant. In Oliver Stone's film JFK, it is Sen. Russell Long who prompts Jim Garrison (the District Attorney of Orleans Parish) to reopen his investigation into Lee Harvey Oswald's activities in New Orleans during the summer of 1963 (beginning with Oswald's association with David W. Ferrie and Guy Bannister). According to author Joan Mellen in her book A Farewell to Justice, Jim Garrison told her it was actually Boggs that prompted him to reopen his investigation into the assassination of the President.

In the 1979 novel The Matarese Circle, author Robert Ludlum portrayed Boggs as having been killed to stop his probe into the assassination.

Boggs served as Majority Whip from 1962 to 1971 and as Majority Leader from January 1971 until his disappearance. As Whip, he ushered much of President Johnson's Great Society legislation through Congress.

In late 1966, Boggs was asked to help the merger of the National and American Football Leagues by obtaining an anti-trust exemption for the merged league. He and Senator Russell Long (also from Louisiana) got the exemption passed. The merger went through and the league put a team in Louisiana, the New Orleans Saints.

On August 22, 1968, while Secretary of State Dean Rusk was testifying in a hearing concerning the Vietnam War, Boggs interrupted the session to announce the invasion of Czechoslovakia by Soviet troops. That caused Secretary Rusk, who was previously unaware of the situation, to excuse himself immediately, mid-testimony, to attend to the issue of the invasion. (Source: Walter Cronkite: The Way It Was: The 1960s)

On 5 April 1971, he made a speech on the floor of the House in which he strongly attacked Federal Bureau of Investigation Director J. Edgar Hoover and the whole of the FBI. He stated that the FBI had him under surveillance and that they were violating the Bill of Rights. He added that numerous members of Congress had expressed their belief to him in private that the FBI was monitoring their phone conversations and criticized the FBI for placing agents on college campuses in order to infiltrate certain organizations. Boggs demanded the resignation of Hoover and accused the FBI of utilizing "the tactics of the Soviet Union and Hitler's Gestapo". This speech shocked many, including his own staff and fellow Congress members.

That led to a conversation on April 6, 1971 between President Richard M. Nixon and the Republican minority leader, Gerald Ford. Nixon said that he could no longer take counsel from Boggs as a senior member of Congress. In the recording of this call, Nixon asked Ford to arrange for the House delegation to include an alternative to Boggs. Ford speculated that Boggs was either drinking too much or taking pills that were upsetting him mentally.

On April 22, 1971, Boggs went even further: "Over the postwar years, we have granted to the elite and secret police within our system vast new powers over the lives and liberties of the people. At the request of the trusted and respected heads of those forces, and their appeal to the necessities of national security, we have exempted those grants of power from due accounting and strict surveillance."

== Disappearance in Alaska ==
Boggs disappeared in the Alaska triangle in 1972. As majority leader, Boggs often campaigned for others, including Representative Nick Begich of Alaska. On October 16, 1972, Boggs was aboard a twin-engine Cessna 310 with Representative Begich, who was facing a possible tight race in the November 1972 general election against the Republican candidate, Don Young, when it disappeared during a flight from Anchorage to Juneau. Also on board were Begich's aide, Russell Brown, and pilot Don Jonz; the four were heading to a campaign fundraiser for Begich.

The search for the missing aircraft and four men included the U.S. Coast Guard, Navy, Army, Air Force, Civil Air Patrol and civilian fixed-wing aircraft and helicopters.

An emergency position-indicating emergency locator transmitter (ELT) was not required at this time. This accident influenced the adoption of the ELT requirement in 1973.

No emergency-transmission signal determined to be from the plane was heard during the search. In its report on the incident, the National Transportation Safety Board stated that the pilot's portable emergency transmitter, permissible in lieu of a fixed transmitter on the plane, was found in an aircraft at Fairbanks. The report also notes that a witness saw an unidentified object in the pilot's briefcase that resembled, except for color, the portable emergency transmitter. The safety board concluded that neither the pilot nor aircraft had an emergency location transmitter.

On November 24, 1972, the search was suspended after 39 days. Neither the wreckage of the plane nor the pilot's and passengers' remains were ever found. After a hearing and seven-minute jury deliberation, his death certificate was signed by Judge Dorothy Tyner.

After Boggs and Begich were re-elected posthumously that November, House Resolution 1 of January 3, 1973, officially recognized Boggs's presumed death and opened the way for a special election. The same was done for Begich.

In summer 2020, Boggs's disappearance was investigated in a podcast produced by iHeartMedia called Missing in Alaska.

In 1973, Boggs's wife since 1938, Lindy, was elected as a Democrat to the 93rd Congress, by special election, to the second district seat left vacant by her husband's death. She was reelected to the eight succeeding Congresses (March 20, 1973 – January 3, 1991) and retired after the 1990 election. In 1997, President Bill Clinton appointed Lindy Boggs U.S. Ambassador to the Holy See, in which capacity she served until 2001.

== Personal life ==
Hale and Lindy Boggs had four children: Cokie Roberts, who was a U.S. TV and public-radio journalist and the wife of journalist Steven V. Roberts, Thomas Hale Boggs Jr., who was a Washington, D.C.–based lawyer and lobbyist, Barbara Boggs Sigmund, who served as mayor of Princeton, New Jersey, and William Robertson Boggs, who died as an infant on December 28, 1946. In 1982, Sigmund lost a bid for the Democratic nomination for the U.S. Senate to Frank Lautenberg.

Boggs was a practicing Catholic.

== Tributes ==
The Hale Boggs Memorial Bridge, which spans the Mississippi River in St. Charles Parish, is named in memory of the former congressman. The visitor center at Portage Glacier in Southcentral Alaska (located within Chugach National Forest) is named the Begich, Boggs Visitor Center. Boggs Peak, four miles north of the visitor center, is also named for him. The Hale Boggs Federal Complex, at 500 Poydras Street in New Orleans, is also named after him.

In 1993, Boggs was among 13 politicians, past and present, inducted into the first class of the new Louisiana Political Museum and Hall of Fame in Winnfield.

== See also ==
- List of people who disappeared mysteriously at sea
- List of members of the United States Congress who died in office (1950–1999)
- List of members of the American Legion

== Notes ==
U.S. House of Representatives
Preceded by Paul H. Maloney	Member of the U.S. House of Representatives from Louisiana's 2nd congressional district 1941–1943	Succeeded by Paul H. Maloney
Preceded by Paul H. Maloney	Member of the U.S. House of Representatives from Louisiana's 2nd congressional district 1947–1973	Succeeded by Lindy Boggs
Preceded by Mike Mansfield	Chair of the House Campaign Expenditures Committee; 1951–1953	Succeeded by C. W. Bishop
Preceded by Carl Albert	House Majority Whip; 1962–1971	Succeeded by Tip O'Neill
Preceded by Carl Albert	House Majority Leader; 1971–1973	Succeeded by Tip O'Neill
Party political offices
Preceded by Carl Albert	House Democratic Deputy Leader; 1962–1971	Succeeded by Tip O'Neill
Preceded by Carl Albert	House Democratic Leader; 1971–1973	Succeeded by Tip O'Neill
Preceded by Mike Mansfield	Response to the State of the Union address 1972; Served alongside: Carl Albert, Lloyd Bentsen, John Brademas, Frank Church, Thomas Eagleton, Martha Griffiths, John Melcher, Ralph Metcalfe, William Proxmire, Leonor Sullivan	Vacant Title next held by Mike Mansfield
