= Lindy Boggs =

American politician (1916–2013)

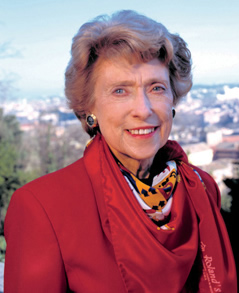
- Portrait, 1997

5th United States Ambassador to the Holy See
- In office December 16, 1997 – March 1, 2001
- President: Bill Clinton; George W. Bush
- Preceded by: Raymond Flynn
- Succeeded by: Jim Nicholson

Member of the U.S. House of Representatives from Louisiana's 2nd district
- In office March 20, 1973 – January 3, 1991
- Preceded by: Hale Boggs
- Succeeded by: William J. Jefferson

Personal details
- Born: Marie Corinne Morrison Claiborne; March 13, 1916 New Roads, Louisiana, U.S.
- Died: July 27, 2013 (aged 97) Chevy Chase, Maryland, U.S.
- Party: Democratic
- Spouse: Hale Boggs (m. 1938; died 1972)
- Children: 4, including Barbara, Tommy, and Cokie
- Education: Tulane University (BA)

Marie Corinne Morrison Claiborne Boggs (March 13, 1916 – July 27, 2013) was a politician who served as a member of the U.S. House of Representatives and later as United States Ambassador to the Holy See. She was the first woman elected to Congress from Louisiana. She was also a permanent chairwoman of the 1976 Democratic National Convention, which met in New York City to nominate the Carter-Mondale ticket. She was the first woman to preside over a major party convention.

Boggs was the widow of former Majority Leader of the United States House of Representatives Hale Boggs. She is one of three female U.S. Representatives from Louisiana, the others being Catherine Small Long and Julia Letlow, each of whom took office in special elections after the death of their husbands.

== Early life and education ==
Boggs was born as Marie Corinne Morrison Claiborne on March 13, 1916, on the Brunswick Plantation near New Roads in Pointe Coupee Parish in South Louisiana, the daughter of Corinne Morrison and Roland Philemon Claiborne, a prominent lawyer. Claiborne's father died when she was just two, but her resemblance to her father earned her the nickname "Lindy," short for the female version of Roland, "Rolinde."

She graduated from Newcomb College, the women's college at Tulane University in New Orleans in 1935. In 1934, Lindy Claiborne met Thomas Hale Boggs at Tulane where the pair worked as editors for the school newspaper, The Hullabaloo. Boggs attended Tulane Law School and earned his law degree in 1937 while Claiborne worked as a school teacher after the pair graduated from Tulane. Claiborne and Boggs were married on January 22, 1938 in New Roads, Louisiana. They had four children: Cokie Roberts (a television journalist); Thomas Hale Boggs, Jr. (a lobbyist); Barbara Boggs Sigmund, a mayor of Princeton, New Jersey, and an unsuccessful candidate in the 1982 New Jersey Democratic senatorial primary election (won by Frank Lautenberg); and William Robertson Boggs, who died as an infant on December 28, 1946.

== Career ==
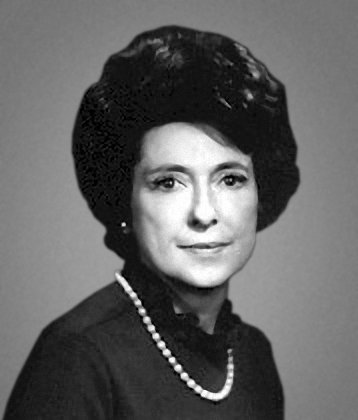
Lindy Boggs, 1975 Congressional Portrait

In 1940, Hale Boggs won a seat in the House of Representatives and the Boggs family relocated to Washington, D.C. Boggs lost his 1942 re-election bid, but subsequently returned to win a seat as the representative of Jefferson Parish in 1947 where he served until his death.

On October 16, 1972, Representative Hale Boggs's twin-engine Cessna plane disappeared over Alaska. Boggs was helping a colleague, Nicholas Begich, father of future U.S. Senator Mark Begich of Alaska, to campaign for reelection. The first bill that the House passed in 1973, House Resolution 1, officially recognized Hale Boggs's death and created the need for a special election. Lindy Boggs ran successfully as a Democrat for her husband's vacated seat in Louisiana's 2nd congressional district, in New Orleans.

External videos
- Fresh Air Remembers Former Louisiana Congresswoman Lindy Boggs, Fresh Air

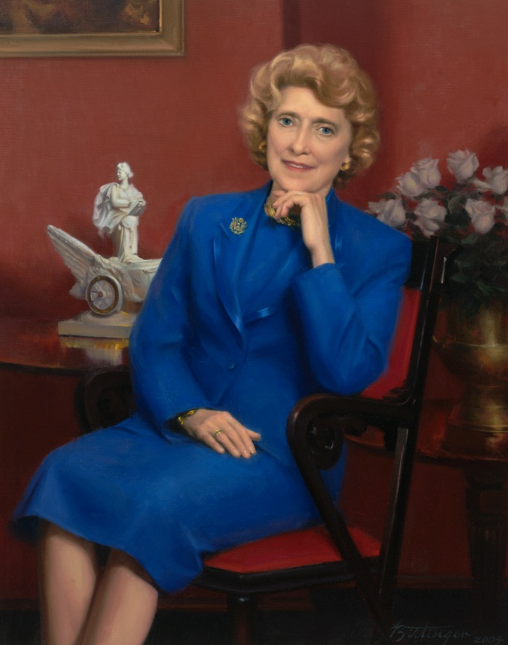
Corinne Claiborne (Lindy) Boggs, painting by Ned Bittinger, 2004

Boggs was elected to a full term in 1974 with 82 percent of the vote and was re-elected seven times thereafter until she vacated her office in January 1991. Otherwise, Boggs polled more than 80 percent in her contested races. After her district was redrawn in 1984 in response to a federal court order mandating Louisiana's first majority-African-American district, she became the only white member of Congress representing a majority-African-American constituency. She announced her retirement from public office in 1990. She was succeeded by William J. Jefferson.

=== Accomplishments ===
She was influential in composing the Equal Credit Opportunity Act of 1974. When the Banking committee marked up the ECOA, she added the provision banning discrimination due to sex or marital status without informing the other members of the committee beforehand, personally inserting the language on her own and photocopying new versions of the bill. She then told the other committee members, "Knowing the members composing this committee as well as I do, I'm sure it was just an oversight that we didn't have 'sex' or 'marital status' included. I've taken care of that, and I trust it meets with the committee's approval." The committee unanimously approved the bill.

Boggs was the first woman to preside over a national political convention, specifically the 1976 Democratic National Convention. In the 1980 Presidential election Boggs was on the Vice-Presidential shortlist for Senator Ted Kennedy during his primary challenge of President Carter.

She always remained an anti-abortion advocate. She believed that her pro-life views was one of the main reasons why she wasn't chosen as running mate for Walter Mondale for the 1984 U.S. presidential election, despite being briefly considered.

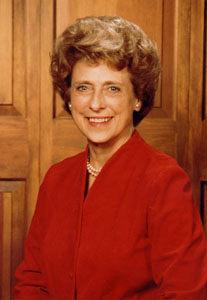
Lindy Boggs in 1984

In 1991, she was awarded the Laetare Medal by the University of Notre Dame, the oldest and most prestigious award for American Catholics.

In 1994, Boggs was inducted into the Louisiana Political Museum and Hall of Fame in Winnfield, one year after her husband had been among the original thirteen inductees.

In 1997, President Bill Clinton appointed her official U.S. ambassador to the Holy See, a position she held until 2001.

In 2005, Boggs's home on Bourbon Street in New Orleans' French Quarter sustained moderate wind damage from Hurricane Katrina. In 2006, she was awarded the Congressional Distinguished Service Award for her time in the House of Representatives.

Boggs was a member of Sigma Gamma Rho, one of the four traditionally African-American sororities in the United States.

The Boggs Center for Energy and Biotechnology Building at Tulane is named in her honor.

Boggs and her daughter, Cokie Roberts, received the Foremother Award from the National Center for Health Research in 2013.

== Death ==
Boggs died of natural causes at her home in Chevy Chase, Maryland on July 27, 2013, at age 97. A funeral Mass was held on August 1, 2013 at St. Louis Cathedral at 615 Pere Antoine Alley in New Orleans. Interment followed later in the day at St. Mary's Cemetery in New Roads, Louisiana.

== Posthumous tributes ==
After her death, Governor Bobby Jindal ordered all U.S. and state flags in Louisiana to fly at half staff until August 2, 2013 in Mrs. Boggs's memory.

In 2019, Time created 89 new covers to celebrate women of the year starting from 1920; it chose Boggs for 1974.

== See also ==
- Women in the United States House of Representatives

U.S. House of Representatives
Preceded by Hale Boggs	Member of the U.S. House of Representatives from Louisiana's 2nd congressional district 1973–1991	Succeeded by William Jefferson
New office	Chairperson of the Joint Bicentennial Committee; 1975–1977	Position abolished
New office	Chairperson of the House Bicentennial Commission; 1985–1989	Position abolished
Party political offices
Preceded by Larry O'Brien	Permanent Chairperson of the Democratic National Convention; 1976	Succeeded by Tip O'Neill
Diplomatic posts
Preceded by Raymond Flynn	United States Ambassador to the Holy See; 1997–2001	Succeeded by Jim Nicholson
