= 1928 United States presidential election in Michigan =

- November 6, 1928

All 15 Michigan votes to the Electoral College

Nominee	Herbert Hoover	Al Smith
Party	Republican	Democratic
Home state	California	New York
Running mate	Charles Curtis	Joseph T. Robinson
Electoral vote	15	0
Popular vote	965,396	396,762
Percentage	70.36%	28.92%
County results
Hoover
40–50%
50–60%
60–70%
70–80%
80–90%
President before election
Calvin Coolidge
Republican
Elected President
Herbert Hoover
Republican

The 1928 United States presidential election in Michigan took place on November 6, 1928, as part of the 1928 United States presidential election. Voters chose 15 representatives, or electors, to the Electoral College, who voted for president and vice president.

Ever since the Panic of 1893 and the Populist movement, Michigan had been a rigidly one-party polity dominated by the Republican Party. In the 1894 elections, the Democratic Party lost all but one seat in the Michigan legislature, and over the four ensuing decades the party would never make major gains there.

The dominance of the culture of the Lower Peninsula by anti-slavery Yankees would be augmented by the turn of formerly Democratic-leaning German Catholics away from that party as a result of the remodelled party's agrarian and free silver sympathies, which became rigidly opposed by both the upper class and workers who followed them, while the Populist movement eliminated Democratic ties with the business and commerce of Michigan and other Northern states. By the 1920s, the only significant financial backer of the state Democratic Party was billionaire William Comstock.

Unlike the other states of the Upper Midwest, the Yankee influence on the culture of the Lower Peninsula was so strong that left-wing third parties did not provide significant opposition to the Republicans, nor was there more than a moderate degree of coordinated factionalism within the hegemonic Michigan Republican Party.

In 1918 a major reaction against incumbent President Woodrow Wilson throughout the Midwest, due to supposed preferential treatment of Southern farmers. Republicans would hold every seat in the State Senate for over a decade after the fall election, as they had between 1895 and 1897 and between 1905 and 1911, and every seat in both houses of the state legislature between 1921 and 1923 and again from 1925 to 1927.

Despite the one-party dominance of the state's legislature, Woodbridge Nathan Ferris would be elected to the Senate in 1922 as the first Democrat to represent Michigan since 1858 after Newberry v. United States ruled that party primaries were not subject to the Federal Corrupt Practices Act, (Note: The ruling in Newberry v. United States was a plurality decision only, and would be overturned in 1941 by United States v. Classic.) so that enough Republicans who had opposed Truman Newberry in the fraudulent 1918 primary backed Ferris for him to win by two percentage points. In 1924, unlike every other Upper Midwestern state, Progressive candidate Robert M. La Follette performed only moderately in heavily Yankee and Polish Lower Michigan. Even in the more Scandinavian and anti-clerical Upper Peninsula, where La Follette support in Michigan was centred, the Wisconsin Senator failed to match his performance in the other Upper Midwest states. Consequently, the inevitable nomination with all other Democrats sitting the election out of La Follette endorsee New York City Catholic Al Smith did not make for a significant reaction in Michigan.

This was the final election in which Michigan voted for presidential electors directly. The state switched to the modern "short ballot" for the following election.

== Results ==
General Election Results
Party	Pledged to	Elector	Votes
Republican	Herbert Hoover	Albert E. Sleeper	965,396
Republican	Herbert Hoover	Ira W. Jayne	961,897
Republican	Herbert Hoover	James B. Bradley	961,541
Republican	Herbert Hoover	Paul Woodworth	961,358
Republican	Herbert Hoover	Charles T. Fisher	961,185
Republican	Herbert Hoover	Clara Comstock Russell	961,171
Republican	Herbert Hoover	Jesse H. Root	961,171
Republican	Herbert Hoover	George Leland	961,151
Republican	Herbert Hoover	Thomas Read	961,006
Republican	Herbert Hoover	Pearle Tyler Colman	960,918
Republican	Herbert Hoover	Mina Humphrey Varnum	960,904
Republican	Herbert Hoover	John K. Brower	960,889
Republican	Herbert Hoover	Seth Q. Pulver	960,820
Republican	Herbert Hoover	George J. Eisele	960,745
Republican	Herbert Hoover	Henry K. Gustin	960,264
Democratic	Al Smith	Minnie F. Kaltenburn	396,762
Democratic	Al Smith	Clark C. Hyatt	394,860
Democratic	Al Smith	Michael Hoban	394,787
Democratic	Al Smith	Sidney T. Miller	394,707
Democratic	Al Smith	Claude O. Taylor	394,668
Democratic	Al Smith	Boyez Dansard	394,600
Democratic	Al Smith	Martin Crocker	394,599
Democratic	Al Smith	George D. Schermerborn	394,574
Democratic	Al Smith	Arthur E. Rudolph	394,541
Democratic	Al Smith	Eugema Ryan	394,468
Democratic	Al Smith	John G. Krauth	394,410
Democratic	Al Smith	DeWitt Vought	394,410
Democratic	Al Smith	Thomas Smurthwaite	394,381
Democratic	Al Smith	Lucius G. Hillyer	394,297
Democratic	Al Smith	John Lennane	394,025
Socialist	Norman Thomas	Arthur H. Wood	3,516
Socialist	Norman Thomas	Edward McAfee	3,368
Socialist	Norman Thomas	Samuel Levin	3,367
Socialist	Norman Thomas	Horace T. Auckerman	3,361
Socialist	Norman Thomas	Sam Weinberg	3,358
Socialist	Norman Thomas	Evert Jarvi	3,357
Socialist	Norman Thomas	Meyer Winacow	3,354
Socialist	Norman Thomas	Jacob Bach	3,353
Socialist	Norman Thomas	Arthur Rubenstein	3,353
Socialist	Norman Thomas	Joseph B. Mentony	3,352
Socialist	Norman Thomas	B. F. Underhill	3,351
Socialist	Norman Thomas	W. L. Miller	3,349
Socialist	Norman Thomas	Abraham Binkow	3,348
Socialist	Norman Thomas	Andrew Semrov	3,347
Socialist	Norman Thomas	Joseph Heideman	3,342
Workers	William Z. Foster	Alexander Wuolikainen	2,881
Workers	William Z. Foster	Walter Johnson	2,816
Workers	William Z. Foster	William Miller	2,767
Workers	William Z. Foster	Sarah Victor	2,764
Workers	William Z. Foster	Emil Ojenus	2,761
Workers	William Z. Foster	Joseph Schmies	2,760
Workers	William Z. Foster	Joseph Gerbert	2,748
Workers	William Z. Foster	Anthony Gerlach	2,743
Workers	William Z. Foster	Stanley Brecht	2,736
Workers	William Z. Foster	Irene Vermeerisch	2,734
Workers	William Z. Foster	David Miller	2,731
Workers	William Z. Foster	Pauline Eiges	2,728
Prohibition	William F. Varney	Marien A. Brooks	2,728
Prohibition	William F. Varney	Edward S. Jennings	2,623
Prohibition	William F. Varney	Charles Butler	2,602
Prohibition	William F. Varney	Harold Luttenbacher	2,602
Prohibition	William F. Varney	Ray O. Bentley	2,591
Prohibition	William F. Varney	Edwin W. Mason	2,591
Prohibition	William F. Varney	Howard L. Holmes	2,590
Prohibition	William F. Varney	Thomas Archer	2,588
Prohibition	William F. Varney	Jacob Imhoff	2,587
Prohibition	William F. Varney	Mary McKnight	2,585
Prohibition	William F. Varney	Belden C. Hoyt	2,580
Prohibition	William F. Varney	Christopher Tucker	2,578
Prohibition	William F. Varney	Libbie Chaterman	2,577
Prohibition	William F. Varney	Emer L. Wilder	2,577
Prohibition	William F. Varney	E. M. Loose	2,566
Socialist Labor	Verne L. Reynolds	Thomas J. Rado	799
Socialist Labor	Verne L. Reynolds	Richard A. O'Brien	754
Socialist Labor	Verne L. Reynolds	Nick Ross	748
Socialist Labor	Verne L. Reynolds	Lazar Kostich	743
Socialist Labor	Verne L. Reynolds	Otto Anderson	742
Socialist Labor	Verne L. Reynolds	John Vonica	741
Socialist Labor	Verne L. Reynolds	Hugo Gerasbeck	737
Socialist Labor	Verne L. Reynolds	John F. Walzel	737
Socialist Labor	Verne L. Reynolds	Steve Mitchell	734
Socialist Labor	Verne L. Reynolds	Frank Robie	732
Socialist Labor	Verne L. Reynolds	Joseph Medved	731
Socialist Labor	Verne L. Reynolds	Paul Sidge	730
Socialist Labor	Verne L. Reynolds	Charles Schwartz	729
Socialist Labor	Verne L. Reynolds	Charles Schepovich	728
Socialist Labor	Verne L. Reynolds	Jordan Theodoroff	724
Votes cast (Note: Based on highest elector on each ticket)			1,372,082

=== Results by county ===
County	Herbert Hoover Republican		Al Smith Democratic		Norman Thomas Socialist		William Z. Foster Workers		William F. Varney Prohibition		Verne L. Reynolds Socialist Labor		Margin		Total votes cast
County	#	%	#	%	#	%	#	%	#	%	#	%	#	%	Total votes cast
Alcona	1,149	78.81%	302	20.71%	2	0.14%	4	0.27%	1	0.07%	0	0.00%	847	58.09%	1,458
Alger	1,716	59.05%	1,053	36.24%	24	0.83%	105	3.61%	4	0.14%	4	0.14%	663	22.81%	2,906
Allegan	10,792	81.65%	2,358	17.84%	19	0.14%	4	0.03%	40	0.30%	4	0.03%	8,434	63.81%	13,217
Alpena	3,467	63.43%	1,984	36.30%	7	0.13%	1	0.02%	6	0.11%	1	0.02%	1,483	27.13%	5,466
Antrim	2,756	84.46%	484	14.83%	10	0.31%	2	0.06%	11	0.34%	0	0.00%	2,272	69.63%	3,263
Arenac	1,612	67.87%	749	31.54%	8	0.34%	2	0.08%	3	0.13%	1	0.04%	863	36.34%	2,375
Baraga	2,203	65.27%	1,046	30.99%	3	0.09%	119	3.53%	4	0.12%	0	0.00%	1,157	34.28%	3,375
Barry	6,044	79.94%	1,459	19.30%	14	0.19%	2	0.03%	42	0.56%	0	0.00%	4,585	60.64%	7,561
Bay	12,467	56.88%	9,395	42.87%	19	0.09%	5	0.02%	26	0.12%	5	0.02%	3,072	14.02%	21,917
Benzie	1,849	84.28%	321	14.63%	16	0.73%	3	0.14%	5	0.23%	0	0.00%	1,528	69.64%	2,194
Berrien	19,064	68.60%	8,555	30.78%	68	0.24%	20	0.07%	77	0.28%	7	0.03%	10,509	37.81%	27,791
Branch	6,818	74.51%	2,266	24.77%	19	0.21%	1	0.01%	44	0.48%	2	0.02%	4,552	49.75%	9,150
Calhoun	24,379	80.40%	5,769	19.03%	69	0.23%	14	0.05%	72	0.24%	18	0.06%	18,610	61.38%	30,321
Cass	5,720	70.24%	2,346	28.81%	34	0.42%	4	0.05%	33	0.41%	6	0.07%	3,374	41.43%	8,143
Charlevoix	3,489	79.97%	842	19.30%	25	0.57%	1	0.02%	5	0.11%	1	0.02%	2,647	60.67%	4,363
Cheboygan	2,743	60.34%	1,784	39.24%	5	0.11%	2	0.04%	11	0.24%	1	0.02%	959	21.10%	4,546
Chippewa	5,326	68.68%	2,355	30.37%	8	0.10%	54	0.70%	9	0.12%	3	0.04%	2,971	38.31%	7,755
Clare	1,920	82.62%	381	16.39%	9	0.39%	3	0.13%	7	0.30%	4	0.17%	1,539	66.22%	2,324
Clinton	6,161	75.04%	2,013	24.52%	8	0.10%	26	0.32%	2	0.02%	0	0.00%	4,148	50.52%	8,210
Crawford	776	76.30%	237	23.30%	2	0.20%	2	0.20%	0	0.00%	0	0.00%	539	53.00%	1,017
Delta	5,420	49.59%	5,419	49.58%	44	0.40%	16	0.15%	22	0.20%	9	0.08%	1	0.01%	10,930
Dickinson	5,840	55.57%	4,626	44.02%	26	0.25%	6	0.06%	6	0.06%	5	0.05%	1,214	11.55%	10,509
Eaton	8,493	78.38%	2,285	21.09%	20	0.18%	1	0.01%	36	0.33%	1	0.01%	6,208	57.29%	10,836
Emmet	3,679	75.36%	1,166	23.88%	21	0.43%	1	0.02%	12	0.25%	3	0.06%	2,513	51.47%	4,882
Genesee	42,743	79.37%	10,910	20.26%	83	0.15%	22	0.04%	71	0.13%	24	0.04%	31,833	59.11%	53,853
Gladwin	1,795	83.76%	341	15.91%	3	0.14%	4	0.19%	0	0.00%	0	0.00%	1,454	67.85%	2,143
Gogebic	6,061	64.74%	3,134	33.48%	24	0.26%	118	1.26%	18	0.19%	7	0.07%	2,927	31.26%	9,362
Grand Traverse	4,429	74.56%	1,489	25.07%	5	0.08%	1	0.02%	16	0.27%	0	0.00%	2,940	49.49%	5,940
Gratiot	8,823	82.14%	1,854	17.26%	18	0.17%	46	0.43%	0	0.00%	0	0.00%	6,969	64.88%	10,741
Hillsdale	8,282	80.99%	1,893	18.51%	5	0.05%	2	0.02%	43	0.42%	1	0.01%	6,389	62.48%	10,226
Houghton	11,240	62.30%	6,573	36.43%	20	0.11%	171	0.95%	25	0.14%	13	0.07%	4,667	25.87%	18,042
Huron	7,046	64.79%	3,797	34.91%	4	0.04%	1	0.01%	26	0.24%	1	0.01%	3,249	29.88%	10,875
Ingham	29,383	78.90%	7,654	20.55%	85	0.23%	16	0.04%	93	0.25%	12	0.03%	21,729	58.34%	37,243
Ionia	9,471	74.91%	3,089	24.43%	22	0.17%	2	0.02%	57	0.45%	2	0.02%	6,382	50.48%	12,643
Iosco	1,873	76.79%	552	22.63%	4	0.16%	3	0.12%	7	0.29%	0	0.00%	1,321	54.16%	2,439
Iron	4,103	63.96%	2,262	35.26%	4	0.06%	32	0.50%	8	0.12%	6	0.09%	1,841	28.70%	6,415
Isabella	4,926	73.13%	1,762	26.16%	13	0.19%	1	0.01%	34	0.50%	0	0.00%	3,164	46.97%	6,736
Jackson	25,080	76.71%	7,462	22.82%	38	0.12%	10	0.03%	95	0.29%	8	0.02%	17,618	53.89%	32,693
Kalamazoo	23,626	79.20%	5,946	19.93%	158	0.53%	6	0.02%	81	0.27%	13	0.04%	17,680	59.27%	29,830
Kalkaska	988	84.59%	160	13.70%	13	1.11%	5	0.43%	2	0.17%	0	0.00%	828	70.89%	1,168
Kent	56,573	75.12%	18,229	24.21%	154	0.20%	119	0.16%	211	0.28%	24	0.03%	38,344	50.91%	75,310
Keweenaw	1,305	76.58%	360	21.13%	28	1.64%	11	0.65%	0	0.00%	0	0.00%	945	55.46%	1,704
Lake	1,147	73.06%	409	26.05%	9	0.57%	1	0.06%	4	0.25%	0	0.00%	738	47.01%	1,570
Lapeer	6,514	82.80%	1,312	16.68%	9	0.11%	2	0.03%	29	0.37%	1	0.01%	5,202	66.12%	7,867
Leelanau	1,521	62.41%	903	37.05%	3	0.12%	10	0.41%	0	0.00%	0	0.00%	618	25.36%	2,437
Lenawee	14,794	76.94%	4,321	22.47%	16	0.08%	2	0.01%	88	0.46%	6	0.03%	10,473	54.47%	19,227
Livingston	5,642	72.88%	2,075	26.81%	4	0.05%	20	0.26%	0	0.00%	0	0.00%	3,567	46.08%	7,741
Luce	1,466	80.24%	350	19.16%	1	0.05%	6	0.33%	4	0.22%	0	0.00%	1,116	61.08%	1,827
Mackinac	1,879	57.94%	1,355	41.78%	2	0.06%	1	0.03%	5	0.15%	1	0.03%	524	16.16%	3,243
Macomb	12,845	63.28%	7,363	36.27%	28	0.14%	18	0.09%	39	0.19%	6	0.03%	5,482	27.01%	20,299
Manistee	4,129	60.73%	2,624	38.59%	8	0.12%	23	0.34%	13	0.19%	2	0.03%	1,505	22.14%	6,799
Marquette	10,879	68.81%	4,716	29.83%	36	0.23%	143	0.90%	27	0.17%	10	0.06%	6,163	38.98%	15,811
Mason	4,318	72.74%	1,567	26.40%	23	0.39%	7	0.12%	10	0.17%	11	0.19%	2,751	46.34%	5,936
Mecosta	4,422	80.94%	1,004	18.38%	15	0.27%	3	0.05%	17	0.31%	2	0.04%	3,418	62.57%	5,463
Menominee	4,255	50.02%	4,198	49.35%	32	0.38%	8	0.09%	11	0.13%	3	0.04%	57	0.67%	8,507
Midland	4,555	82.25%	964	17.41%	4	0.07%	12	0.22%	3	0.05%	0	0.00%	3,591	64.84%	5,538
Missaukee	1,756	87.19%	247	12.26%	3	0.15%	8	0.40%	0	0.00%	0	0.00%	1,509	74.93%	2,014
Monroe	10,202	58.27%	7,242	41.37%	15	0.09%	9	0.05%	37	0.21%	2	0.01%	2,960	16.91%	17,507
Montcalm	7,691	82.54%	1,572	16.87%	14	0.15%	40	0.43%	1	0.01%	0	0.00%	6,119	65.67%	9,318
Montmorency	787	73.97%	270	25.38%	5	0.47%	2	0.19%	0	0.00%	0	0.00%	517	48.59%	1,064
Muskegon	16,997	76.28%	5,158	23.15%	55	0.25%	29	0.13%	37	0.17%	5	0.02%	11,839	53.13%	22,281
Newaygo	4,552	83.29%	888	16.25%	2	0.04%	2	0.04%	19	0.35%	2	0.04%	3,664	67.04%	5,465
Oakland	45,343	81.53%	10,011	18.00%	140	0.25%	58	0.10%	43	0.08%	23	0.04%	35,332	63.53%	55,618
Oceana	3,555	79.55%	871	19.49%	18	0.40%	1	0.02%	21	0.47%	3	0.07%	2,684	60.06%	4,469
Ogemaw	1,630	73.39%	579	26.07%	4	0.18%	2	0.09%	6	0.27%	0	0.00%	1,051	47.32%	2,221
Ontonagon	2,394	59.66%	1,353	33.72%	10	0.25%	240	5.98%	6	0.15%	10	0.25%	1,041	25.94%	4,013
Osceola	3,923	86.66%	582	12.86%	3	0.07%	17	0.38%	2	0.04%	0	0.00%	3,341	73.80%	4,527
Oscoda	476	86.39%	73	13.25%	2	0.36%	0	0.00%	0	0.00%	0	0.00%	403	73.14%	551
Otsego	1,049	68.52%	476	31.09%	3	0.20%	3	0.20%	0	0.00%	0	0.00%	573	37.43%	1,531
Ottawa	15,417	85.48%	2,524	14.00%	28	0.16%	6	0.03%	56	0.31%	4	0.02%	12,893	71.49%	18,035
Presque Isle	1,992	65.50%	1,029	33.84%	6	0.20%	3	0.10%	8	0.26%	3	0.10%	963	31.67%	3,041
Roscommon	780	76.25%	236	23.07%	4	0.39%	3	0.29%	0	0.00%	0	0.00%	544	53.18%	1,023
Saginaw	22,467	65.61%	11,555	33.75%	61	0.18%	21	0.06%	120	0.35%	18	0.05%	10,912	31.87%	34,242
Sanilac	7,888	81.59%	1,736	17.96%	10	0.10%	14	0.14%	16	0.17%	4	0.04%	6,152	63.63%	9,668
Schoolcraft	1,826	66.81%	877	32.09%	20	0.73%	1	0.04%	8	0.29%	1	0.04%	949	34.72%	2,733
Shiawassee	9,851	79.40%	2,496	20.12%	13	0.10%	3	0.02%	41	0.33%	3	0.02%	7,355	59.28%	12,407
St. Clair	18,177	71.57%	7,151	28.15%	15	0.06%	5	0.02%	41	0.16%	10	0.04%	11,026	43.41%	25,399
St. Joseph	8,781	76.05%	2,698	23.37%	26	0.23%	3	0.03%	34	0.29%	4	0.03%	6,083	52.68%	11,546
Tuscola	8,188	84.39%	1,464	15.09%	10	0.10%	41	0.42%	0	0.00%	0	0.00%	6,724	69.30%	9,703
Van Buren	9,325	77.39%	2,643	21.93%	34	0.28%	3	0.02%	40	0.33%	5	0.04%	6,682	55.45%	12,050
Washtenaw	19,676	78.41%	5,308	21.15%	51	0.20%	9	0.04%	47	0.19%	2	0.01%	14,368	57.26%	25,093
Wayne	265,852	62.30%	157,047	36.80%	1,629	0.38%	1,369	0.32%	369	0.09%	452	0.11%	108,805	25.50%	426,718
Wexford	4,825	84.53%	853	14.94%	12	0.21%	18	0.32%	0	0.00%	0	0.00%	3,972	69.59%	5,708
Totals	965,396	70.36%	396,762	28.92%	3,516	0.26%	2,881	0.21%	2,728	0.20%	799	0.06%	568,634	41.44%	1,372,082

== Analysis ==
Neither Smith nor Republican nominees Herbert Hoover of California and running mate Charles Curtis campaigned in Michigan. A small poll at the end of September showed Hoover leading in Michigan by 286 votes to 160, whilst a larger poll in October showed Hoover leading by three to one. As it turned out, the October poll was accurate: Hoover received slightly over seventy percent of the popular vote compared to Smith and running mate Joseph T. Robinson's 28.92 percent.

With 70.36 percent of the popular vote, Michigan would prove to be Hoover's second strongest victory in the nation after Kansas. Hoover nonetheless fell five percent short of Calvin Coolidge's record performance from 1924 due to losses of up to twenty percent in the pro-La Follette western Upper Peninsula, and in heavily Catholic Wayne and Huron Counties. Nevertheless, scholars have demonstrated that there was no realignment of the one-party system in Michigan until the following 1932 election. The Democratic Party did however win a seat in the state Senate for the first time since 1916.

As of the 2024 presidential election, this remains the last time a Republican presidential candidate carried Wayne County, home of Michigan's most populous city, Detroit, and also the last time any presidential candidate won every single county in the state (which only previously occurred in 1904, 1908, 1920, and 1924). It would also be the last time a candidate received more than 70% of the vote in Michigan.

== See also ==
- United States presidential elections in Michigan
