= List of United States Supreme Court cases, volume 256 =

Supreme Court of the United States
- Interactive map of Supreme Court of the United States
- 38°53′26″N 77°00′16″W
- Established: March 4, 1789; 236 years ago
- Location: Washington, D.C.
- Coordinates: 38°53′26″N 77°00′16″W
- Composition method: Presidential nomination with Senate confirmation
- Authorised by: Constitution of the United States, Art. III, § 1
- Judge term length: life tenure, subject to impeachment and removal
- Number of positions: 9 (by statute)
- Website: supremecourt.gov

This is a list of cases reported in volume 256 of United States Reports, decided by the Supreme Court of the United States in 1921.

== Justices of the Supreme Court at the time of volume 256 U.S. ==
The Supreme Court is established by Article III, Section 1 of the Constitution of the United States, which says: "The judicial Power of the United States, shall be vested in one supreme Court . . .". The size of the Court is not specified; the Constitution leaves it to Congress to set the number of justices. Under the Judiciary Act of 1789 Congress originally fixed the number of justices at six (one chief justice and five associate justices). Since 1789 Congress has varied the size of the Court from six to seven, nine, ten, and back to nine justices (always including one chief justice).

When the cases in volume 256 were decided the Court comprised the following nine members:

Portrait	Justice	Office	Home State	Succeeded	Date confirmed by the Senate (Vote)	Tenure on Supreme Court
	Edward Douglass White	Chief Justice	Louisiana	Melville Fuller	December 12, 1910 (Acclamation)	December 19, 1910 – May 19, 1921 (Died)
	Joseph McKenna	Associate Justice	California	Stephen Johnson Field	January 21, 1898 (Acclamation)	January 26, 1898 – January 5, 1925 (Retired)
	Oliver Wendell Holmes Jr.	Associate Justice	Massachusetts	Horace Gray	December 4, 1902 (Acclamation)	December 8, 1902 – January 12, 1932 (Retired)
	William R. Day	Associate Justice	Ohio	George Shiras Jr.	February 23, 1903 (Acclamation)	March 2, 1903 – November 13, 1922 (Retired)
	Willis Van Devanter	Associate Justice	Wyoming	Edward Douglass White (as Associate Justice)	December 15, 1910 (Acclamation)	January 3, 1911 – June 2, 1937 (Retired)
	Mahlon Pitney	Associate Justice	New Jersey	John Marshall Harlan	March 13, 1912 (50–26)	March 18, 1912 – December 31, 1922 (Resigned)
	James Clark McReynolds	Associate Justice	Tennessee	Horace Harmon Lurton	August 29, 1914 (44–6)	October 12, 1914 – January 31, 1941 (Retired)
	Louis Brandeis	Associate Justice	Massachusetts	Joseph Rucker Lamar	June 1, 1916 (47–22)	June 5, 1916 – February 13, 1939 (Retired)
	John Hessin Clarke	Associate Justice	Ohio	Charles Evans Hughes	July 24, 1916 (Acclamation)	October 9, 1916 – September 18, 1922 (Retired)

== Notable Cases in volume 256 U.S. ==
=== Block v. Hirsh ===
In Block v. Hirsh, 256 U.S. 135 (1921), the Supreme Court upheld a temporary rent control law in the District of Columbia. It set a precedent in American law that government can regulate housing conditions during times of emergency to maintain or improve living conditions. In 1924, however, the rental property statute upheld in the case reached the Court for a second review. This time, despite the language being the same, the statute was struck down. The Court held that the emergency necessitating the measure had passed, and that that which "justified interference with ordinarily existing property rights as of 1919 had come to an end by 1922."

=== Newberry v. United States ===
Newberry v. United States, 256 U.S. 232 (1921), is a decision by the Supreme Court which held that the United States Constitution did not grant the United States Congress the authority to regulate political party primaries or nomination processes. The Court struck down 1911 amendments to the Federal Corrupt Practices Act which placed spending limits on candidate and political election committee spending in primaries or other nomination processes for federal office.

=== Brown v. United States ===
In Brown v. United States, 256 U.S. 335 (1921), the Supreme Court held that if a person is attacked, and that person reasonably believes that they are in immediate danger of death or grievous bodily injury, then they have no duty to retreat and may stand their ground; if they kill the attacker they have not exceeded the bounds of lawful self-defense. In writing the opinion, Justice Oliver Wendell Holmes stated "Detached reflection cannot be demanded in the presence of an uplifted knife. Therefore, in this Court, at least, it is not a condition of immunity that one in that situation should pause to consider whether a reasonable man might not think it possible to fly with safety or to disable his assailant rather than to kill him."

=== Dillon v. Gloss ===
Dillon v. Gloss, 256 U.S. 368 (1921), is a case in which the Supreme Court held that Congress, when proposing a constitutional amendment under the authority given to it by Article V of the Constitution, may fix a definite period for its ratification, and further, that the reasonableness of the seven-year period, fixed by Congress in the resolution proposing the Eighteenth Amendment is beyond question.

== Citation style ==
Under the Judiciary Act of 1789 the federal court structure at the time comprised District Courts, which had general trial jurisdiction; Circuit Courts, which had mixed trial and appellate (from the US District Courts) jurisdiction; and the United States Supreme Court, which had appellate jurisdiction over the federal District and Circuit courts—and for certain issues over state courts. The Supreme Court also had limited original jurisdiction (i.e., in which cases could be filed directly with the Supreme Court without first having been heard by a lower federal or state court). There were one or more federal District Courts and/or Circuit Courts in each state, territory, or other geographical region.

The Judiciary Act of 1891 created the United States Courts of Appeals and reassigned the jurisdiction of most routine appeals from the district and circuit courts to these appellate courts. The Act created nine new courts that were originally known as the "United States Circuit Courts of Appeals." The new courts had jurisdiction over most appeals of lower court decisions. The Supreme Court could review either legal issues that a court of appeals certified or decisions of court of appeals by writ of certiorari. On January 1, 1912, the effective date of the Judicial Code of 1911, the old Circuit Courts were abolished, with their remaining trial court jurisdiction transferred to the U.S. District Courts.

Bluebook citation style is used for case names, citations, and jurisdictions.

- "# Cir." = United States Court of Appeals
  - e.g., "3d Cir." = United States Court of Appeals for the Third Circuit
- "D." = United States District Court for the District of . . .
  - e.g.,"D. Mass." = United States District Court for the District of Massachusetts
- "E." = Eastern; "M." = Middle; "N." = Northern; "S." = Southern; "W." = Western
  - e.g.,"M.D. Ala." = United States District Court for the Middle District of Alabama
- "Ct. Cl." = United States Court of Claims
- The abbreviation of a state's name alone indicates the highest appellate court in that state's judiciary at the time.
  - e.g.,"Pa." = Supreme Court of Pennsylvania
  - e.g.,"Me." = Supreme Judicial Court of Maine

== List of cases in volume 256 U.S. ==
Case Name	Page and year	Opinion of the Court	Concurring opinion(s)	Dissenting opinion(s)	Lower Court	Disposition
Chase v. United States	1 (1921)	McKenna	none	none	8th Cir.	affirmed
Gilpin v. United States	10 (1921)	McKenna	none	none	8th Cir.	affirmed
United States v. Smith	11 (1921)	McKenna	none	none	Ct. Cl.	affirmed
Silver King Coalition Mines Company v. Conkling Mining Company	18 (1921)	Holmes	none	none	8th Cir.	reversed
Arkansas v. Mississippi	28 (1921)	per curiam	none	none	original	boundary set
Baldwin Company v. R.S. Howard Company	35 (1921)	Day	none	none	D.C. Cir.	dismissed
American Steel Foundries v. Whitehead	40 (1921)	Day	none	none	D.C. Cir.	dismissed
Minnesota ex rel. Whipple v. Martinson	41 (1921)	Day	none	none	Minn.	affirmed
Galbraith v. Vallely	46 (1921)	Day	none	none	8th Cir.	reversed
United States v. Northern Pacific Railroad Company	51 (1921)	VanDevanter	none	none	9th Cir.	reversed
Oklahoma v. Texas	70 (1921)	Pitney	none	none	original	boundary set
Ownbey v. Morgan	94 (1921)	Pitney	none	White	Del.	affirmed
Economy Light and Power Company v. United States	113 (1921)	Pitney	none	none	7th Cir.	affirmed
Wall v. Chesapeake and Ohio Railway Company	125 (1921)	McReynolds	none	none	Ill.	dismissed
Bank of Minden v. Clement	126 (1921)	McReynolds	none	none	La.	reversed
Miller and Lux, Inc. v. Sacramento and San Joaquin Drainage District	129 (1921)	McReynolds	none	none	Cal.	dismissed
Ex parte National Park Bank of New York	131 (1921)	Brandeis	none	none	5th Cir.	mandamus denied
Missouri Pacific Railroad Company v. McGrew Coal Company	134 (1921)	Brandeis	none	none	Mo.	affirmed
Block v. Hirsh	135 (1921)	Holmes	none	McKenna	D.C. Cir.	reversed
Marcus Brown Holding Company v. Feldman	170 (1921)	Holmes	none	McKenna	S.D.N.Y.	affirmed
Privett v. United States	201 (1921)	VanDevanter	none	none	8th Cir.	affirmed
Atchison, Topeka and Santa Fe Railway Company v. United States	205 (1921)	VanDevanter	none	none	Ct. Cl.	reversed
Frey and Son, Inc. v. Cudahy Packing Company	208 (1921)	McReynolds	none	Pitney	4th Cir.	affirmed
Nickel v. Cole	222 (1921)	Holmes	none	none	Nev.	affirmed
St. Louis–San Francisco Railway Company v. Middlekamp	226 (1921)	Holmes	none	none	W.D. Mo.	affirmed
Newberry v. United States	232 (1921)	McReynolds	McKenna, Pitney	White	W.D. Mich.	reversed
New York v. New Jersey	296 (1921)	Clarke	none	none	original	dismissed
St. Louis and East St. Louis Electric Railway Company v. Missouri ex rel. Hagerman	314 (1921)	Clarke	none	none	Mo.	affirmed
Blanset v. Cardin	319 (1921)	McKenna	none	none	8th Cir.	affirmed
Philadelphia and Reading Railroad Company v. Di Donato	327 (1921)	McKenna	none	none	Pa.	reversed
Philadelphia and Reading Railroad Company v. Polk	332 (1921)	McKenna	none	none	Pa.	reversed
Brown v. United States	335 (1921)	Holmes	none	none	5th Cir.	reversed
New York Trust Company v. Eisner	345 (1921)	Holmes	none	none	S.D.N.Y.	affirmed
American Bank and Trust Company v. Federal Reserve Bank of Atlanta	350 (1921)	Holmes	none	none	5th Cir.	reversed
Heitmuller v. Stokes	359 (1921)	Day	none	none	D.C. Cir.	reversed
Krichman v. United States	363 (1921)	Day	none	none	2d Cir.	reversed
Dillon v. Gloss	368 (1921)	VanDevanter	none	none	N.D. Cal.	affirmed
LaBelle Iron Works v. United States	377 (1921)	Pitney	none	none	Ct. Cl.	affirmed
Frederick v. Fidelity Mutual Life Insurance Company of Philadelphia	395 (1921)	Pitney	none	none	Pa. Super. Ct.	affirmed
Yee Won v. White	399 (1921)	McReynolds	none	none	9th Cir.	affirmed
United States v. Aetna Explosives Company	402 (1921)	McReynolds	none	none	Ct. Cust. App.	affirmed
New York Central Railroad Company v. York and Whitney Company	406 (1921)	McReynolds	none	none	Mass. Super. Ct.	multiple
Vicksburg, Shreveport and Pacific Railway Company v. Anderson-Tully Company	408 (1921)	Clarke	none	none	5th Cir.	affirmed
Ex parte Matthew Addy Steamship and Commerce Corporation	417 (1921)	Clarke	none	none	E.D. Va.	mandamus denied
Bethlehem Motors Corporation v. Flynt	421 (1921)	McKenna	none	none	N.C.	reversed
Michigan Central Railroad Company v. Mark Owen and Company	427 (1921)	McKenna	none	McReynolds	Ill.	affirmed
Garland's Heirs v. Choctaw Nation	439 (1921)	McKenna	none	none	Ct. Cl.	reversed
United States v. American Chicle Company	446 (1921)	Holmes	none	none	S.D.N.Y.	reversed
United States v. Yuginovich	450 (1921)	Day	none	none	D. Or.	affirmed
Burdeau v. McDowell	465 (1921)	Day	none	Brandeis	W.D. Pa.	reversed
McLaren v. Fleischer	477 (1921)	VanDevanter	none	none	Cal.	affirmed
Culpepper v. Ocheltree	483 (1921)	VanDevanter	none	none	Cal.	affirmed
United States v. Bowling	484 (1921)	VanDevanter	none	none	8th Cir.	reversed
Ex parte New York I	490 (1921)	Pitney	none	none	W.D.N.Y.	prohibition issued
Ex parte New York II	503 (1921)	Pitney	none	none	W.D.N.Y.	prohibition issued
Ex parte Lincoln Gas and Electric Light Company	512 (1921)	Pitney	none	none	D. Neb.	mandamus denied
Anchor Oil Company v. Gray	519 (1921)	Pitney	none	none	8th Cir.	affirmed
United States v. Hutto I	524 (1921)	Pitney	none	none	W.D. Okla.	reversed
United States v. Hutto II	530 (1921)	Pitney	none	none	W.D. Okla.	reversed
Choctaw, Oklahoma and Gulf Railroad Company v. Mackey	531 (1921)	Brandeis	none	none	8th Cir.	affirmed
Yazoo and Mississippi Valley Railroad Company v. Nichols Company	540 (1921)	Brandeis	none	none	Miss.	affirmed
United States v. Pfitsch	547 (1921)	Brandeis	none	none	S.D.N.Y.	dismissed
Missouri Pacific Railroad Company v. Ault	554 (1921)	Brandeis	none	none	Ark.	reversed
Norfolk Southern Railroad Company v. Owens	565 (1921)	Brandeis	none	none	N.C.	reversed
Western Union Telegraph Company v. Esteve Brothers and Company	566 (1921)	Brandeis	none	none	5th Cir.	reversed
Sutton v. United States	575 (1921)	Brandeis	none	none	Ct. Cl.	affirmed
District of Columbia v. Andrews Paper Company	582 (1921)	Clarke	none	none	D.C. Cir.	reversed
Dane v. Jackson	589 (1921)	Clarke	none	none	Mass.	affirmed
Oklahoma v. Texas	602 (1921)	per curiam	none	none	original	continued
Missouri, Kansas and Texas Railway Company v. United States	610 (1921)	Holmes	none	none	Ct. Cl.	affirmed
Ex parte Bey	616 (1921)	VanDevanter	none	none	not indicated	mandamus denied
Texas Company v. Hogarth Shipping Company, Ltd.	619 (1921)	VanDevanter	none	none	2d Cir.	affirmed
United States v. Woodward	632 (1921)	VanDevanter	none	none	Ct. Cl.	affirmed
Merchants' National Bank of Richmond v. City of Richmond	635 (1921)	Pitney	none	none	Va.	reversed
Bowman v. Continental Oil Company	642 (1921)	Pitney	none	none	D.N.M.	reversed
Harris v. District of Columbia	650 (1921)	McReynolds	none	none	D.C. Cir.	certification
Seaboard Air Line Railroad Company v. United States	655 (1921)	McReynolds	none	none	Ct. Cl.	reversed
Kansas City Southern Railway Company v. Road Improvement District Number 6 of Little River County, Arkansas	658 (1921)	McReynolds	none	none	Ark.	reversed
Western Union Telegraph Company v. Poston	662 (1921)	Brandeis	none	none	S.C.	reversed
Weber Electric Company v. Freeman Electric Company	668 (1921)	Clarke	none	none	3d Cir.	affirmed
