= 1918 United States Senate election in Michigan =

- November 5, 1918
- Turnout: 15.60%
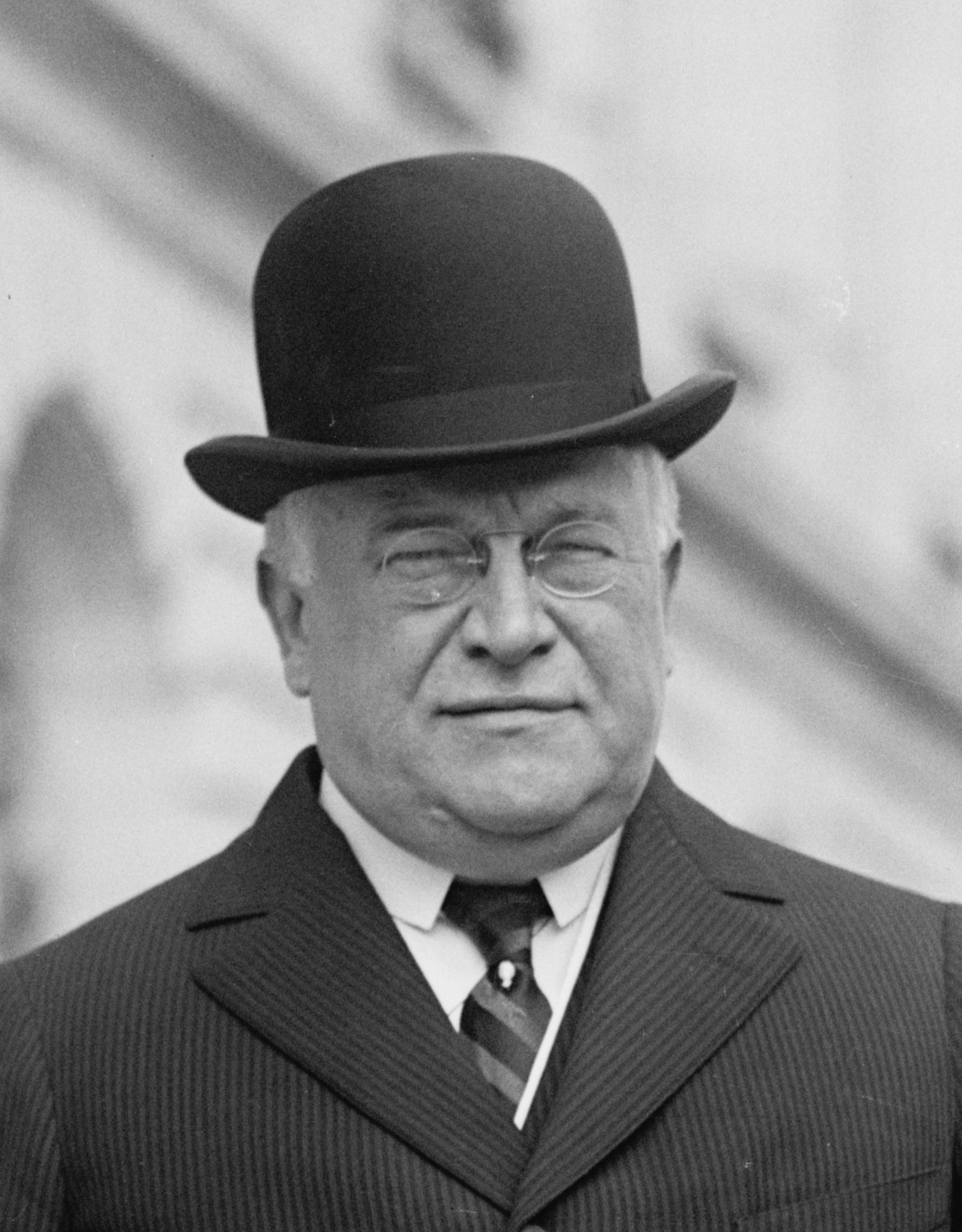

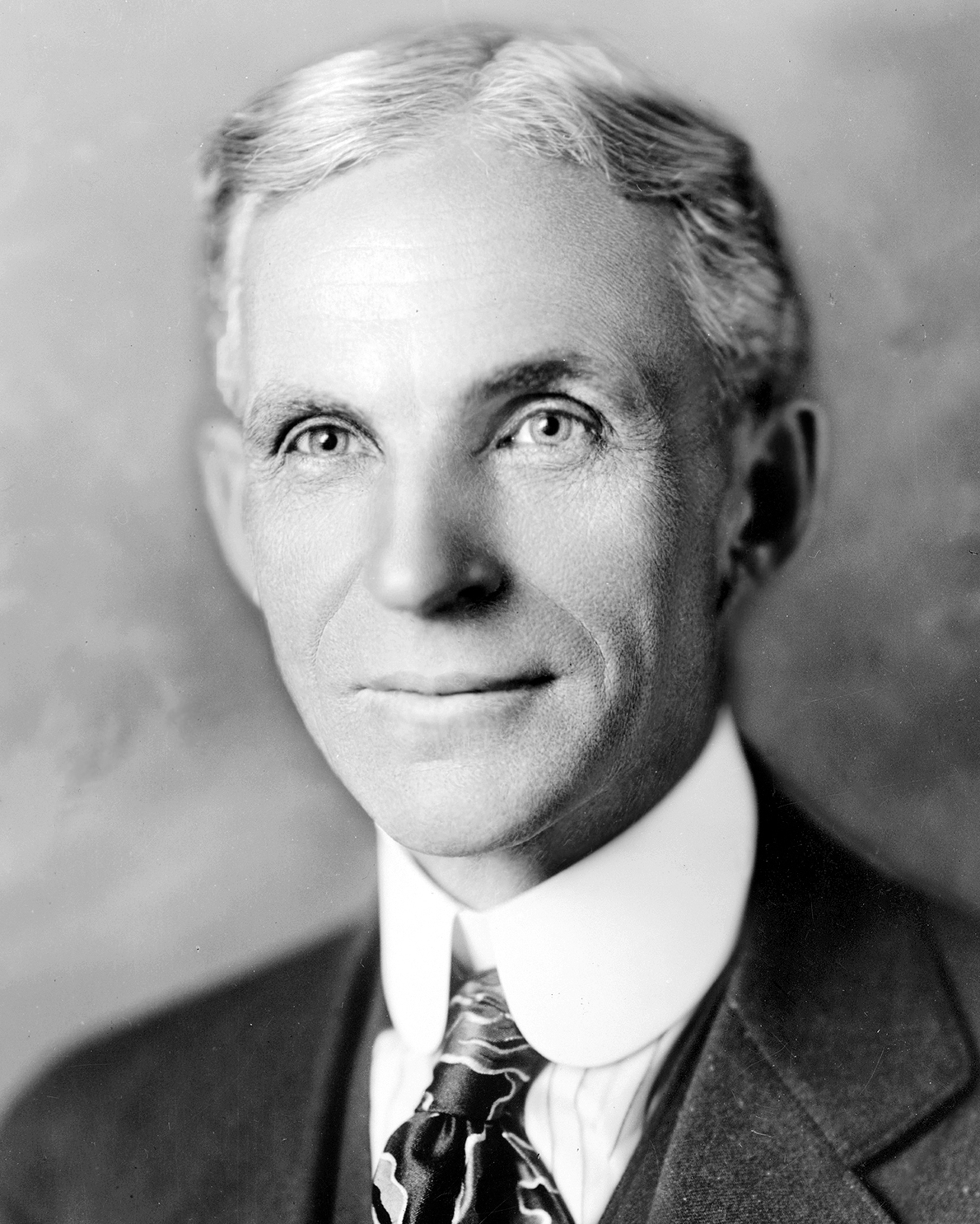
Nominee	Truman Newberry	Henry Ford
Party	Republican	Democratic
Popular vote	220,054	212,487
Percentage	50.19%	48.47%
- County results Newberry: 40–50% 50–60% 60–70% 70–80% Ford: 40–50% 50–60% 60–70%
U.S. senator before election
William Alden Smith
Republican
Elected U.S. Senator
Truman Handy Newberry
Republican

The 1918 United States Senate election in Michigan took place on November 5, 1918. Incumbent Republican Senator William Alden Smith did not seek re-election to a third term in office. In the race to succeed him, Truman Handy Newberry defeated the automobile industrialist Henry Ford. Ford first challenged Newberry in the Republican Party primary and lost, then faced Newberry again as the Democratic nominee in the general election.

The race was highly controversial for campaign spending practices by both major candidates, with Newberry also hammering Ford for his pacifism during World War I, his antisemitism, and for helping his son Edsel avoid the draft. Newberry narrowly won the election but was ultimately forced to resign from the Senate under scrutiny for his campaign spending in this race.

Primary elections were held on August 27. Ford easily won the Democratic nomination, having secured the support of President Woodrow Wilson and the Michigan Democratic Party establishment before entering the race. In the Republican primary, Newberry ran an expensive campaign with a very large staff, forcing the incumbent Smith and former governor Fred M. Warner out of the race. His campaign spending was criticized by both Ford supporters and progressive Republicans, who supported former governor Chase Osborn. Newberry won the Republican nomination with a plurality of the vote, defeating Ford by around 43 thousand votes.

In the general election, both candidates continued spending exorbitant sums, in an apparent violation of the campaign finance restrictions of the Federal Corrupt Practices Act (FCPA). Newberry was criticized in particular by members of his own party and subject to a United States Senate investigation before the end of the campaign. Although Newberry prevailed in the election by fewer than eight thousand votes, he was convicted for violating the FCPA. His conviction was later overturned on appeal to the United States Supreme Court in Newberry v. United States, which found that Congress could not regulate spending during party primaries or nomination processes. Despite his ultimate vindication on criminal charges, Newberry resigned from office in 1922 after facing renewed calls for his expulsion from the Senate after the Republican majority fell to four seats.

== Republican primary ==
=== Candidates ===
- Henry Ford, industrialist and anti-war activist (also running as Democratic)
- Truman H. Newberry, former U.S. navy secretary
- Chase Osborn, former governor of Michigan (1911–13)
- William G. Simpson

==== Withdrew ====
- William Alden Smith, incumbent U.S. senator since 1907 (withdrew July 26)
- Fred M. Warner, former governor of Michigan (1905–11) (withdrew June 18)

==== Declined ====
- James Couzens, mayor of Detroit
- Arthur Vandenberg, publisher of the Grand Rapids Herald and Smith aide

=== Campaign ===
In August 1917, Michigan governor Albert Sleeper and his staff, disappointed in Senator William Alden Smith, suggested former U.S. Secretary of the Navy Truman H. Newberry for Smith's seat and encouraged Newberry, by way of an intermediary, to run. In October, a meeting of Sleeper's staff was held at Port Huron, where the governor pledged to stay out of the race but his staff unanimously supported Newberry. A month later, Roger M. Andrews, one of the men present, wrote to Newberry encouraging him to enter the race as Sleeper's preferred candidate. Newberry responded that the possibility was "intensely interesting."

By February 1918, Newberry had begun building a campaign apparatus, hiring Paul H. King of Detroit to manage his campaign on March 1. King gradually built an extremely large campaign staff throughout the state, headquartered at the Ford Building in Detroit.

On June 7, Fred M. Warner entered the race only to withdraw eleven days later after Henry Ford entered the race. After much speculation, Ford formally announced his campaign on June 14 with the endorsement of President Woodrow Wilson. Because Ford was broadly popular across the state and Michigan had no sore loser law, he filed to run in both parties' primaries. With Wilson's support, he was virtually assured of the Democratic nomination, but if he could win the Republican nomination as well, he would likely be assured of election in the fall.

Smith ended his re-election campaign on July 26, one day before the deadline for filing nominating petitions.

In early August, newspapers including the Escanaba Journal, Charlotte Republican, and Smith's own Grand Rapids Herald (under the pen of Arthur Vandenberg) published editorials criticizing Newberry for his excessive campaign spending. The newspapers declared that Newberry could not be nominated because, if elected, there would be no difficulty for the Democratic caucus in the Senate to prove he had obtained his seat illegally and expel him. Newberry replied by claiming that he had the assurance of his campaign staff that all expenditures were within the law. On August 15, his campaign committee issued a statement formally adopting that position. Vandenberg, lieutenant governor Luren Dickinson, and state representative Merlin Wiley, who was managing the Osborn campaign, were harshly critical of the campaign response.

=== Results ===
The primary election was held on August 27 and resulted in a victory for Newberry.

1918 United States Senate election in Michigan
Party	Candidate	Votes	%
Republican	Truman Newberry	114,963	47.23%
Republican	Henry Ford	71,800	29.87%
Republican	Chase S. Osborn	47,019	19.56%
Republican	William G. Simpson	5,970	2.48%
Write-in		620	0.22%
Total votes		240,372	100.00%

On September 6, the Newberry campaign committee reported $176,560.08 of spending on the primary campaign (approximately $2,500,000 in 2025 dollars), of which $147,860.16 was for "advertising and other publicity." Newberry's largest donations came from his brother John, his brother-in-law Victor Barnes, and Henry Bourne Joy, the president of Packard Motors and a rival of Ford.

== Democratic primary ==
=== Candidates ===
- Henry Ford, industrialist and anti-war activist (also running as Republican)
- James W. Helme

=== Campaign ===
The Democratic Party was behind Ford from the start. President Wilson's endorsement was preceded by a June 4 meeting of the Democratic state committee at Lansing, where the party called for Ford as a compromise candidate of all parties and demanded that all Republicans withdraw from the race. However, a dissident movement led by William J. Mickel instead supported James W. Helme for the Democratic nomination.

=== Results ===
The primary election was held on August 27 and resulted in a victory for Ford.

1918 Democratic U.S. Senate primary
Party	Candidate	Votes	%
Democratic	Henry Ford	30,791	78.45%
Democratic	James W. Helme	8,414	21.44%
Write-in		43	0.01%
Total votes		39,248	100.00%

== General election ==
=== Candidates ===
- William J. Faull (Prohibition)
- Henry Ford, industrialist and anti-war activist (Democratic)
- Edward O. Foss (Socialist and Socialist Labor)
- Truman Handy Newberry, former Secretary of the Navy (Republican)

=== Campaign ===
Newberry's extravagant primary spending became a focus of the general election campaign. In an open letter published September 17, Osborn congratulated Newberry on his victory and pledged his support but urged Newberry to confess that he had knowingly broken campaign finance laws without realizing the enormity of his offense. On the same day, Democratic senator Atlee Pomerene of Ohio presented a resolution to the Senate to investigate Newberry's campaign expenses; the resolution was postponed until after the election by a vote of 10–1. Billboards and other campaign advertisements were posted throughout Michigan attacking Newberry's spending. On October 6, William G. Simpson published another letter on arraigning Newberry. Several of the Newberry campaign staff were held in contempt of court for refusing to testify to a federal grand jury in response to subpoenas.

=== Results ===
1918 United States Senate election in Michigan
Party	Candidate	Votes	%
Republican	Truman Handy Newberry	220,054	50.19%
Democratic	Henry Ford	212,487	48.47%
Socialist	Edward O. Foss	4,763	1.09%
Prohibition	William J. Faull	1,133	0.26%
Write-in		15	0.00%
Total votes		438,437	100%
Republican hold			

==== Senate investigation and recount ====
Ford initially declined to seek a recount. His secretary stated, "We believe that the campaign has been clean, as campaigns go, and therefore are willing to abide by the return sheets." One week later, however, Ford hinted at the possibility of a recount, arguing that Wall Street had conspired to back Newberry because he opposed President Wilson.

In December, Ford's counsel obtained court-ordered injunctions for the preservation of ballots, poll books, and tally sheets. Ford petitioned the Senate on January 6, 1919, to recount the November ballots and investigate spending during both the primary and general elections. On January 17, Ford and Newberry testified before the Senate Committee on Privileges and Elections, chaired by Pomerene. Ford's counsel asked for an immediate investigation and recount, claiming that Newberry had only acknowledged a fraction of his spending and had actually expended over $500,000 (approximately $7.1 million in 2025 dollars) during the primary campaign. A resolution to that effect was presented by Arizona senator Henry F. Ashurst and it passed the committee with one Republican vote.

On January 27, the same day the Ashurst resolution passed out of committee, Michigan's senior senator Charles E. Townsend presented a letter from Newberry, accusing Ford of running "the most elaborate, expensive, and pretentious [campaign] in the history of the State" and charging improper and unlawful practices by Ford workers in Wayne County, a Republican stronghold which Ford had won by 35,000 votes. A resolution to investigate Newberry's counter-charges was presented the next day. Ford denied the charges "in as emphatic language as parliamentary rules will permit."

In response to the two competing resolutions, the Committee on Privileges and Elections submitted a substitute resolution, recognizing that the case would come before the following Senate seated in March 1919 and authorizing the preservation of ballots and documents for hearing in the 66th Congress. It was ultimately conceded that no challenge could be made to seating Newberry until he had actually received his credentials from Senator Smith on March 3.

When the 66th Congress was sworn in, the Republican Party overtook the majority and Pomerene was replaced as committee chair by Vermont senator William P. Dillingham. The Ford petition was once again laid before the committee, along with another resolution for the preservation of evidence, recount of ballots, and investigation of charges and counter-charges. The preservation resolution was reported favorably by the committee to the Senate on June 18. It was referred to the Senate Committee to Audit and Control the Contingent Expenses of the Senate, which also issued a favorable report on December 3.

== Newberry v. United States ==
In parallel to his recount efforts, Ford employed at least 40 private investigators to investigate the Newberry campaign to find evidence supporting criminal charges. They compiled their report and sent it to the United States Department of Justice (DOJ), which assigned a special prosecutor who was a friend of Ford's lead investigator.

The DOJ began its investigation as early as August 1918. A corps of investigations led by federal elections experts Earl Houck and Frank Dailey was sent to Michigan to investigate bank records, safety deposit vaults, and allegations that Newberry had bribed local officials. During subsequent Senate debate, Townsend decried the investigatory effort to "collect evidence of something which would help the administration's candidate for Senator" but also admitted that Newberry's spending was "unconscionable" and had ultimately been detrimental to Newberry's own campaign.

On October 18, 1919, the DOJ announced it would bring charges against Newberry for fraud. A grand jury was empaneled on October 22 in the United States district court for the Western District of Michigan, and on November 29, the grand jury indicted Newberry and 134 others on six counts. The defendants were charged with violations of the Federal Corrupt Practices Act and Michigan statutes made applicable by that Act which forbade any candidate from contributing or expending more than $3,750 in procuring his own nomination or election, criminal conspiracy to violate federal anti-bribery law, and criminal conspiracy to commit mail fraud by embezzling campaign funds for themselves.

Prosecutors presented evidence of fraudulent expenditures between $500,000 and $1,000,000 in connection with the primary and a vast political conspiracy throughout the state of Michigan, including bribery, corruption of the press and elections boards, and voter fraud. Defense counsel argued that the government had failed to adequately present their evidence, leaving the defendants ignorant of the specific acts and witnesses on which the government had built its case. On January 5, the defense argued on demurrer that the indictment was unauthorized because Congress lacked the power to regulate primary elections. Although the judge denied the motion to demur, the United States Supreme Court later upheld this argument in Newberry v. United States in overturning the conviction.

=== Newberry appeal ===
Newberry successfully appealed his conviction to the Supreme Court, which found the FCPA amendments applying to primary elections were unconstitutional in a 5–4 decision in Newberry v. United States. Newberry was allowed to retain his seat, but he was formally condemned by the Senate for his excess spending. Newberry ultimately resigned in 1922, following a series of Republican defeats in the 1922 Senate elections which threatened him with another round of investigations, and Detroit mayor James J. Couzens, a former Ford Motor Company executive, was appointed to his seat.
