= Bank of Minden v. Clement =

- Supreme Court of the United States

Decided April 11, 1921
- Full case name: Bank of Minden v. Clement
- Citations: 256 U.S. 126 (more)

Holding
- States may not retroactively render valid contracts invalid via statute.

Court membership
- Chief Justice Edward D. White Associate Justices Joseph McKenna · Oliver W. Holmes Jr. William R. Day · Willis Van Devanter; Mahlon Pitney · James C. McReynolds; Louis Brandeis · John H. Clarke

Case opinions
- Majority: McReynolds
- Dissent: Clarke

Laws applied
- Contracts Clause

Bank of Minden v. Clement, 256 U.S. 126 (1921), was a United States Supreme Court case in which the court held that states may not retroactively render valid contracts invalid via statute.
