= Brown v. United States (1921) =

- Supreme Court of the United States

Argued November 19, 1920 Decided May 16, 1921
- Full case name: Brown v. United States
- Citations: 256 U.S. 335 (more) 41 S. Ct. 501; 65 L. Ed. 961

Holding
- If a person is attacked, and that person reasonably believes that he is in immediate danger of death or grievous bodily injury, he has no duty to retreat and may stand his ground and, if he kills his attacker, he has not exceeded the bounds of lawful self-defense.

Court membership
- Chief Justice Edward D. White Associate Justices Joseph McKenna · Oliver W. Holmes Jr. William R. Day · Willis Van Devanter; Mahlon Pitney · James C. McReynolds; Louis Brandeis · John H. Clarke

Case opinion
- Majority: Holmes

Brown v. United States, 256 U.S. 335 (1921), was a United States Supreme Court case in which the Court held that if a person is attacked, and that person reasonably believes that he is in immediate danger of death or grievous bodily injury, he has no duty to retreat and may stand his ground and, if he kills his attacker, he has not exceeded the bounds of lawful self-defense.

== Background ==
Brown, the petitioner, and Hermes, the individual killed, had a previous history. Evidence indicated that Hermes had used a knife to assault Brown on two prior occasions and that Hermes threatened that the next time one of them would be taken away in a black box. Given this history, Brown took a handgun with him while supervising excavation work for a post office and put it nearby. Hermes arrived and, according to Brown, came at him with a knife. Brown retreated approximately twenty to twenty-five feet to where he left the pistol and, with Hermes striking at Brown, fired four shots, killing Hermes.

A jury convicted Brown of second degree murder after being instructed by the court that, when considering self-defense, the individual assaulted has a duty to retreat as long as retreat is open to him and would not be dangerous to his person.

== Decision ==
On appeal, the Supreme Court disagreed and reversed the lower court's conviction holding “that if a man reasonably believes that he is in immediate danger of death or grievous bodily harm from his assailant he may stand his ground and that if he kills him he has not exceed the bounds of lawful self-defense.” In writing the opinion, Justice Oliver Wendell Holmes stated that “Detached reflection cannot be demanded in the presence of an uplifted knife. Therefore, in this Court, at least, it is not a condition of immunity that one in that situation should pause to consider whether a reasonable man might not think it possible to fly with safety or to disable his assailant rather than to kill him.”

In reviewing the lower court's decision, Justice Holmes noted that there was evidence that Brown fired his last shot after Hermes went down. Brown testified in the lower court that this was an accidental discharge. The Court determined that a person need not lose a self-defense claim if a last shot followed closely to the others during the heat of conflict and if a person believed that he was fighting for his life.

Justices Clarke and Pitney dissented without writing an opinion.

== See also ==
- Stand-your-ground law
