= Yee Won v. White =

United States Supreme Court case

- Supreme Court of the United States

Decided May 16, 1921
- Full case name: Yee Won v. White, Commissioner of Immigration
- Citations: 256 U.S. 399 (more)

Case history
- Prior: 258 F. 792

Holding
- A Chinese person who lawfully entered the United States as the minor son of a Chinese merchant, and who became a laborer rather than a merchant, is not entitled to bring in his wife and minor children, married and born during his temporary absence in China.

Court membership
- Chief Justice Edward D. White Associate Justices Joseph McKenna · Oliver W. Holmes Jr. William R. Day · Willis Van Devanter; Mahlon Pitney · James C. McReynolds; Louis Brandeis · John H. Clarke

Case opinions
- Majority: McReynolds, joined by White, McKenna, Holmes, Day, Van Devanter, Pitney, Brandeis
- Dissent: Clarke

Laws applied
- Chinese Exclusion Act

Yee Won v. White, 256 U.S. 399 (1921), was a case decided by the Supreme Court of the United States. The court affirmed the prior Ninth Circuit Court of Appeals ruling that Yee Won, a Chinese laundryman in San Francisco, was considered a laborer and not a merchant, thus denying his wife and children entry into the United States from China.

== Background ==
=== The Chinese Exclusion Act ===
The Chinese Exclusion Act of 1882 was the first major law that significantly restricted immigration to the United States. The act was intended to stop all Chinese immigration into the United States, with exceptions for diplomats, teachers, students, merchants, and travelers. The act explicitly prohibited Chinese laborers, both skilled and unskilled, from entering the United States. While the 1882 Chinese Exclusion Act was only a ten-year ban, Congress voted to extend the ban another ten years in 1892 with the Geary Act. In 1902, the ban was made permanent. This resulted in decades of exclusion of Chinese people until the act was repealed in 1943.

=== San Francisco and Angel Island ===
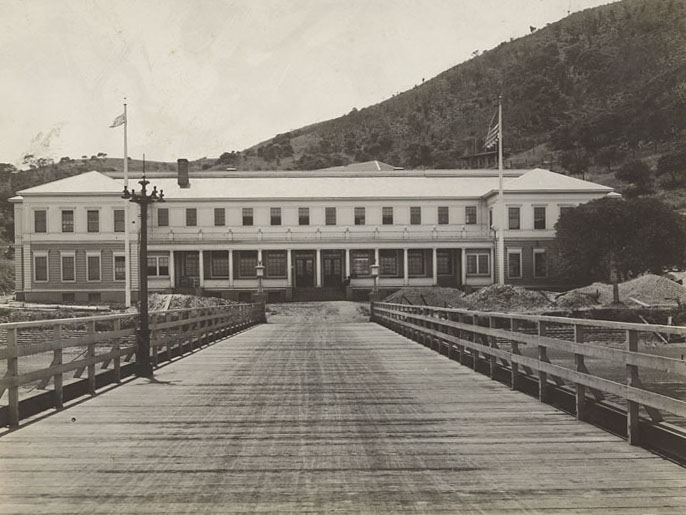
Angel Island Immigration Station, San Francisco, California.

Despite exclusionary laws and practices, San Francisco was a hub of Chinese immigration in the late 19th and early 20th centuries. By 1900, there were approximately 25,000 Chinese immigrants or people of Chinese descent living in San Francisco. The core of this immigration was Angel Island, an immigration station in the San Francisco Bay. Chinese immigrants who entered San Francisco through Angel Island were often treated as the enemy and subject to detentions. This unfair treatment did not end for Chinese immigrants after passing through Angel Island. Upon entering the city of San Francisco, Chinese people were subject to xenophobia and racism in several ways, including through attitudinal racism and legal exclusion. Scholars have identified San Francisco as a crux of Chinese exclusionary practices with anti-Chinese sentiments being widespread.

=== Laundry Work ===
A prominent occupation for Chinese immigrants and people of Chinese descent in San Francisco was laundry work. This work had distinct implications regarding gender dynamics, with "white power laundrymen" making gendered claims about laundry work to delegitimize Chinese laundrymen. This included claiming that those who did laundry work and owned laundromats were classified as "laborers" and not "merchants" despite owning property and running successful laundry businesses.

=== Chinese Litigation ===
Due to the targeted policies towards Chinese immigrants and Chinese Americans such as the Chinese Exclusion Act, many Chinese people pursued legal action to fight discriminatory laws and practices. Chinese litigation in U.S. courts was common during the late 19th and early 20th centuries, with approximately 9,600 corpus cases brought by Chinese petitioners between 1880 and 1990. Laundry litigation was one prominent type of case brought about by Chinese litigants. Out of these thousands of cases, only twenty were elevated to the Supreme Court. Yee Won v. White was one of them.

== Parties ==
=== Plaintiff ===
Yee Won, the plaintiff, was a Chinese-born immigrant who resided in San Francisco. In 1901, a 20-year-old Yee Won arrived to the United States from China. Yee Won lawfully entered through Angel Island and was granted residence due to his status as the son of a resident merchant.

=== Defendant ===
Edward White, the defendant, was the San Francisco Commissioner of Immigration in the early 20th century. White's role as commissioner was to enforce immigration law in San Francisco. White and his staff acted in cooperation with the Department of Justice to investigate, interrogate, and detain immigrants trying to enter the United States at Angel Island. In his role as commissioner, White had legal action taken against him several times in the 1920s. Many of these cases were similar to Yee Won v. White in that they were brought about by Chinese litigants against White and dealt with issues concerning entry to the United States. Three cases against White besides the Yee Won case were also elevated to the Supreme Court: Kwock Jan Fat v. White (1920), Ng Fung Ho et al. v. White (1922), and Chung Fook v. White (1924).

== Facts and Legal Issue ==
=== Facts of the Case ===
Yee Won entered the United States through Angel Island in 1901 as the son of a Chinese merchant. Yee Won's father died in 1908. In 1910, Yee Won applied for an identification of status through the port of San Francisco. This was because Yee Won was leaving for China and such identification would secure Yee Won's admission to the country upon his return. In this application, Yee Won did not claim to be a merchant but rather a "capitalist and property owner." Yee Won secured a certificate to be able to return to China and then legally re-enter the United States. Yee Won departed for China in 1911.

Yee Won returned to the United States in 1914. Upon his return, he brought his wife, Chin Shee, who he married in 1911, and his two children, born in 1912 and 1913. Yee Won's wife and children were applicants to enter the United States, having been born in China and never previously entering the United States. In United States v. Mrs. Gue Lim, it was established that the wives and minor children of Chinese merchants wer able to enter United States without certificates. In support of having his wife and children gain entry under this holding, Yee Won again testified that he was a "property owner and a capitalist," providing evidence such as bank books and other documents to show he was a person of significant means. Yee Won testified that he exported fruit and provided information for a property lease under his name.

While the application for Yee Won's family was pending, the commissioner received anonymous evidence that testified that Yee Won was a laundryman, thus classifying him as a "laborer" and not a "merchant" and unable to bring his family into the United States. The Commissioner of Immigration denied the admission of Yee Won's family members on the grounds that Yee Won's status as exempt from the Chinese Exclusion Act had not been satisfactorily established.

=== Legal Issue ===
The legal issue at hand was whether or not Yee Won was considered a "merchant" and could thus be considered a member of the exempt class under the Chinese Exclusion Act, resulting in his wife and children being able to gain entry to the United States.

== Lower Court Decisions ==
Following the denial of his wife and children's applications, Yee Won filed a petition in the District Court for a writ of habeas corpus, alleging an unfair hearing and abuse of discretion by immigration officials. The District Court dismissed Yee Won's petition. Yee Won appealed this decision, elevating the case to the Ninth Circuit Court of Appeals. The Ninth Circuit concluded that the judgement of the District Court in dismissing the petition was correct. Yee Won filed a writ of certiorari, elevating the case to the Supreme Court, which accepted the case for review.

== Supreme Court Decision ==
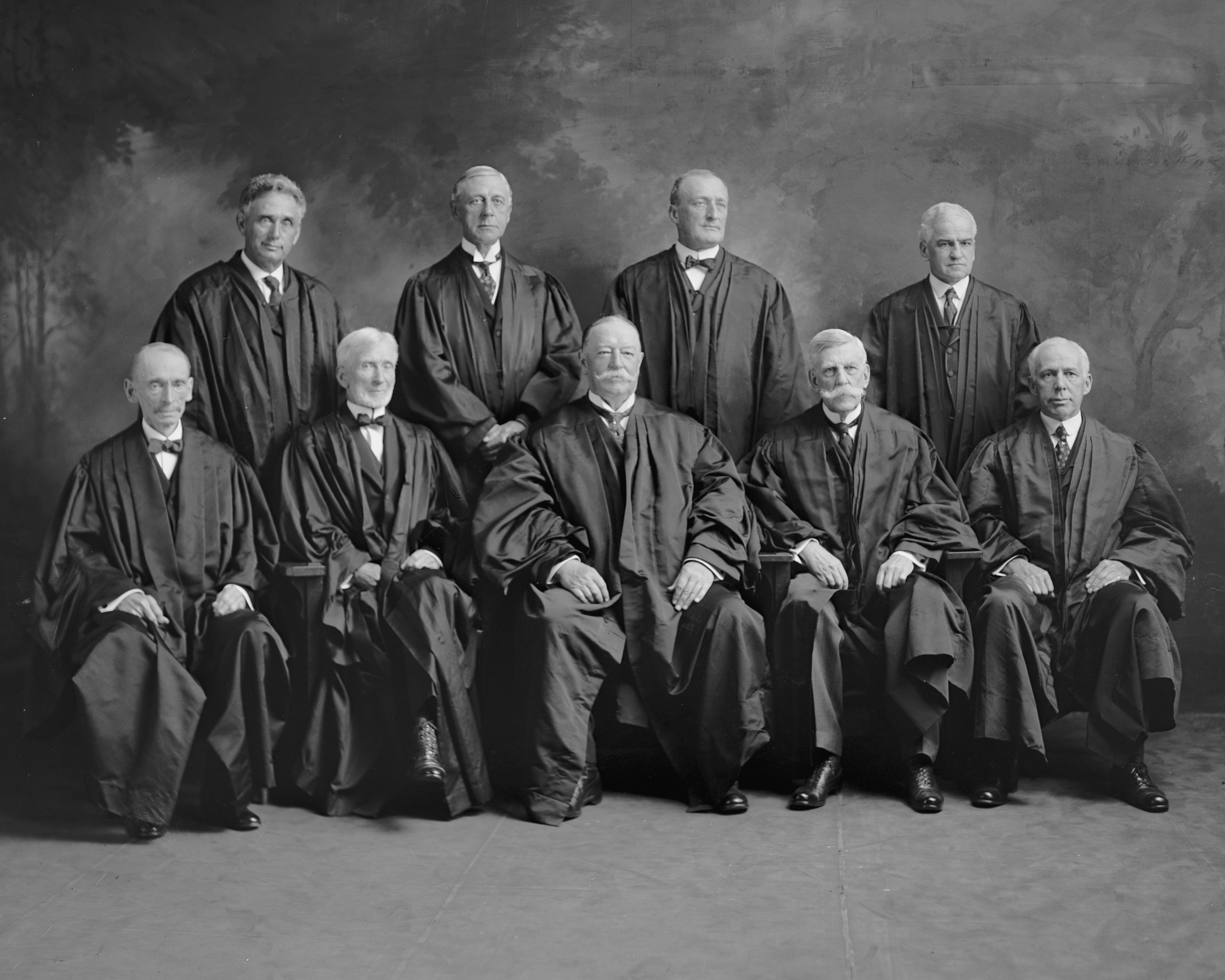
The Supreme Court of the United States 1921-1922. John Hessin Clarke is the justice on the top right.

In an 8-1 ruling, the Supreme Court affirmed the prior Ninth Circuit Court of Appeals decision, which ruled in favor of the defendant, White. Justice James Clark McReynolds delivered the opinion of the court. The court cited the Chinese Exclusion Act as the basis for justification that Yee Won's wife and children could not enter the United States. The court's opinion was that the Chinese Exclusion Act's purpose would be impeded by permitting the entry of wives and minor children of Chinese residents who came as members of the exempt class and later assumed the status of laborers. Thus, the court ruled there was "no such exemption of a resident laborer's wife and minor children."

The sole dissenter of the case was Justice John Hessin Clarke. Clarke was progressive and reform-minded, with deep convictions about the role of the Supreme Court and constitutional interpretations. This resulted in him dissenting in many cases, often being the sole dissenter. Clarke resigned from the Supreme Court one year after Yee Won v. White, in 1922, having served six years since being sworn into the court in 1916.

== Subsequent Developments ==
The Chinese Exclusion Act was repealed in 1943, 22 years after the Yee Won case. While the act was repealed, an immigration quota for Chinese people was established, allowing only 105 visas per year. The Chinese immigration quota was abolished with the Immigration and Nationality Act of 1965, going into effect in 1968. Since then, Chinese immigration has grown immensely, going from just over 800,000 in 1980 to over 4 million in 2020. Despite blatant exclusionary practices ending and Chinese immigration increasing, systemic racism against Chinese immigrants is still present in the legal system, reflecting the long-term impacts of this exclusion. Ultimately, Yee Won v. White leaves a legacy as an example of the real-world impact of the Chinese Exclusion Act and a significant example of Chinese litigation fighting this exclusion.
