= Miller v. American Telephone & Telegraph Co. =

1974 US case on the business judgment rule

- Court: United States Court of Appeals for the Third Circuit
- Full case name: Miller v. American Telephone & Telegraph Co.
- Argued: September 3, 1974
- Decided: November 4, 1974
- Citation: 507 F.2d 759

Court membership
- Judges sitting: Collins J. Seitz, John Joseph Gibbons, Leonard I. Garth

Case opinions
- Majority: Seitz, joined by a unanimous court

Keywords
- Business judgment rule

Miller v. American Telephone & Telegraph Co., 507 F.2d 759 (3d Cir. 1974), is a United States corporate law case that established that a corporate board cannot claim protection of the business judgment rule in a shareholder suit if the decision at issue was a knowing violation of public law.

== Facts ==
American Telephone & Telegraph Co. loaned 1.5 million dollars to the Democratic National Committee in the lead-up to the 1968 election and then did not seek to collect the loan. Certain shareholders sued for waste.

== Reasoning ==
Although the business judgment rule protects corporate board's decisions from second guessing by shareholders or the courts, in this case, the board's decision to "loan" money to the Democratic National Committee was an illegal campaign contribution, in violation of the Tillman Act. The courts found that the decision not to collect on the loan was a knowing decision of the board's, and that it also constituted an illegal campaign contribution. The business judgement rule, therefore, did not protect the board's decision even from a civil suit by shareholders.
