= Block v. Hirsh =

1921 United States Supreme Court case concerning rent control

- Supreme Court of the United States

Argued March 3, 1921 Decided April 18, 1921
- Full case name: Block, Trading Under the Name of Whites, v. Hirsh
- Citations: 256 U.S. 135 (more) 41 S. Ct. 458; 65 L. Ed. 865

Case history
- Prior: Error to the Court of Appeals of the District of Columbia

Holding
- A federal statute, creating a commission with the power to set reasonable rents, and securing a tenant's right of occupancy beyond the expiration of his lease, was constitutional as a temporary emergency measure.

Court membership
- Chief Justice Edward D. White Associate Justices Joseph McKenna · Oliver W. Holmes Jr. William R. Day · Willis Van Devanter; Mahlon Pitney · James C. McReynolds; Louis Brandeis · John H. Clarke

Case opinions
- Majority: Holmes, joined by Brandeis, Clarke, Pitney, Day
- Dissent: McKenna, joined by White, Van Devanter, McReynolds

Laws applied
- The Act of October 22, 1919, c. 80, Title II

Block v. Hirsh, 256 U.S. 135 (1921), is a United States Supreme Court case which upheld a temporary rent control law in the District of Columbia. It set a precedent in American law that government can regulate housing conditions during times of emergency to maintain or improve living conditions.

Three years later, the rental property statute upheld in the case reached the Court for a second review. In Chastleton Corp v. Sinclair, despite the language being the same, the statute was unanimously struck down in a decision where the Court held that the emergency necessitating the measure had passed, and that which "justified interference with ordinarily existing property rights as of 1919 had come to an end by 1922."

== Facts ==
Prior to World War I, housing in the United States was usually regarded as an issue for state and local governments. In the aftermath of the war, the country experienced a national housing shortage. This shortage impelled federal intervention in the housing market, and in October 1919, Congress passed a statute establishing a commission with the power to regulate rental property in the District of Columbia. The statute allowed for the fixing of fair and reasonable rents, and secured a tenant's right of occupancy so long as he paid his rent and performed by the conditions of his lease. However, it reserved to the owner his right to possession for actual bona fide occupancy, as in to provide a home for himself and his relatives. This right was conditioned on the tenant being given a 30 days' notice to vacate the premises. The statute declared that its provisions were made necessary due to emergencies growing out of the war, and limited its duration to a period of two years.

Block was a tenant in an apartment building located at F Street in Washington. His lease was set to expire on December 31, 1919, but he would be allowed to remain in occupancy under the rental property statute. Hirsh, who had recently purchased the building, notified Block on December 15 and requested that he vacate the premises upon expiration of his lease. Hirsh wanted the premises for his own use, but did not see fit to give the 30 days' notice because he denied the validity of the statute. Block declined, and on review, the Court of Appeals held the statute unconstitutional. Block appealed to the Supreme Court.

== Judgment ==
In a 5–4 decision, the Court upheld the law as constitutional. The majority opinion was written by Justice Oliver Wendell Holmes, Jr. Congress's claim, Holmes contended, was that "circumstances have clothed the letting of buildings in the District of Columbia with a public interest so great as to justify regulation by law." These circumstances constituted a "publi[c], notorious, and almost worldwide fact". There was no reason to doubt that the war had bred unseemly conditions in the district, nor Congress's intention of providing an effective remedy to that end. In times of trouble, Holmes concluded, the private may be affected with a public concern, allowing governmental action otherwise considered impermissible. Moreover, condemnation for public use had been repeatedly upheld by the Court in the fields of mining, irrigation and insurance. Holmes noted that state control of privately owned buildings evoked a peculiar apprehension, but nonetheless was within regulatory reach:

The fact that tangible property is also visible tends to give a rigidity to our conception of our rights in it that we do not attach to others less concretely clothed. But the notion that the former are exempt from the legislative modification required from time to time in civilized life is contradicted not only by the doctrine of eminent domain, under which what is taken is paid for, but by that of the police power in its proper sense, under which property rights may be cut down, and to that extent taken, without pay.

The more pressing question, Holmes said, was whether the statute had gone too far in restricting the entitlement of the property owner. Beyond the general police power, and further beyond the power of eminent domain, an eventual clash with the due process right of the Fifth Amendment was inevitable. If unduly exerted, the legislation would be in violation of the takings clause. However, rate fixing in the public interest was a valid form of regulation, as had been decided in Munn v. Illinois. Additionally, the self-imposed time limitation sufficiently dispelled any trepidation that would have been manifest in the case of a permanent change. Holmes concluded with an admonishment in the vein of judicial restraint:

Assuming that the end in view otherwise justified the means adopted by Congress, we have no concern, of course, with the question whether those means were the wisest, whether they may not cost more than they come to, or will effect the result desired. It is enough that we are not warranted in saying that legislation that has been resorted to for the same purpose all over the world is futile or has no reasonable relation to the relief sought.

=== Dissent ===
Justice Joseph McKenna wrote a sharply worded dissent. The conditions imposed by the statute, McKenna said, were "contrary to every conception of leases that the world has ever entertained, and of the reciprocal rights and obligations of lessor and lessee." The constitutional prohibitions on denial of due process and impairment of the obligation of contracts were "so direct and definite as to need no reinforcing words", and the only question was whether the statute fell within the purview of these limitations. McKenna dismissed the claim of wartime necessity, stating that "the country has had other wars with resulting embarrassments, yet they did not induce the relaxation of constitutional requirements nor the exercise of arbitrary power." He warned that the Court's decision might presage a slippery slope of government mandates in other areas deemed necessary for the public improvement:

If such exercise of government be legal, what exercise of government is illegal? Houses are a necessary of life, but other things are as necessary. May they too be taken from the direction of their owners and disposed of by the Government?

In light of this danger, legislative judgement should not be accorded determinative weight: "It is to be remembered that the legality of power must be estimated not by what it will do, but by what it can do." McKenna characterized the statute as an example of socialism:

(...) have conditions come, not only to the District of Columbia, embarrassing the Federal Government, but to the world as well, that are not amenable to passing palliatives, so that socialism, or some form of socialism, is the only permanent corrective or accommodation?

== Significance ==
In 1924, the rental property statute upheld in the case reached the Court for a second review. This time, despite the language being the same, the statute was struck down in a unanimous decision. In Chastleton Corp v. Sinclair, the Court held that the emergency necessitating the measure had passed, and that which "justified interference with ordinarily existing property rights as of 1919 had come to an end by 1922."
