= Rent control =

Regulations to reduce increases in housing rents

Rent control (or rent regulation) is a system of laws for the rental market of dwellings, with controversial effects on affordability of housing and tenancies. Generally, a system of rent regulation involves:

- Price controls, limits on the rent that a landlord may charge, typically called rent control or rent stabilization
- Eviction controls: codified standards by which a landlord may terminate a tenancy (Note: Branco 2011: "Rent Control Laws cannot exist without a coinciding Eviction Control ordinance. The reason being is that if a landlord has a tenant in a rent controlled unit who is paying below market rent, he/she is financially motivated to simply evict the tenant and reset the rent to market rate under the Costa Hawkins Act. Therefore Eviction Control is necessary in order to preserve Rent Controlled tenancies.) (Note: Pender 2016: "If a city only limited rent increases, landlords could simply evict tenants when their lease is up and charge the next one market rates. Two state laws place some limits on both rent control and eviction control. The Costa-Hawkins Rental Housing Act exempts multifamily apartments built after 1 February 1995 – and all single-family homes and condos, whenever built – from limits on rent increases. Costa-Hawkins does not prevent cities from imposing eviction controls on any type of rental housing – including single-family homes and apartments of any age." (This source and quote is included to clarify the difference between rent control and eviction control, and that eviction control laws can (and do) exist separately from and without rent control laws, whereas the converse is not true.))
- Obligations on the landlord or tenant regarding adequate maintenance of the property
- A system of oversight and enforcement by an independent regulator and ombudsman

The term "rent control" covers a spectrum of regulation which can vary from setting the absolute amount of rent that can be charged, with no allowed increases, to placing different limits on the amount that rent can increase. These restrictions may continue between tenancies (vacancy control), or may be applied only within the duration of a tenancy (vacancy decontrol). As of 2016, at least 14 of the 36 OECD countries have some form of rent control in effect in at least one area, including four states in the United States.

Rent regulation is implemented in many forms. It is one of several classes of policies intended to improve housing affordability. However, there is consensus among economists that rent control reduces the quality and quantity of housing units. (Note: Dougherty 2018: "And yet economists from both the right and the left are in almost universal agreement that rent control makes housing problems worse in the long run.")

== Forms ==
Rent control can apply to several types of price control:

- "strict price ceilings", also known as rent freeze systems, or absolute or first generation rent controls, in which no increases in rent are allowed at all (rent is typically frozen at the rate existing when the law was enacted)
- "vacancy control", also known as strict or strong rent control, in which the rental price can rise, but continues to be regulated in between tenancies (a new tenant pays almost the same rent as the previous tenant) and
- "vacancy decontrol", also known as tenancy or second-generation rent control, which limits price increases during a tenancy, but allows rents to rise to market rate between tenancies (new tenants pay market rate rent, but increases are limited as long as they remain).

Rent price controls remain the most controversial element of a system of rent regulation.

== Effects ==
Producer surplus decreases due to price ceiling. Consumer surplus can increase but does not have to, quantity decreases and demand increases.

=== On housing supply ===
There is consensus among economists that rent control reduces the quality and quantity of rental housing units.

One historical example of widespread rent control occurred in the US during World War II. Roughly 80% of rental housing was put under rent control in 1941. The observed result was that landlords opted to sell their units at uncontrolled prices rather than renting at controlled prices, leading to an increase in home ownership and a decrease in rental units.

A number of neo-classical and Keynesian economists say that some forms of rent control regulations create shortages and exacerbate scarcity in the housing market by discouraging private investment in the rental market. In addition, there would be a dead weight loss and inefficiency since some of the loss due to price ceilings is never gained again. This analysis targeted nominal rent freezes, and the studies conducted were mainly focused on rental prices in Manhattan, or elsewhere in the United States.

In 1971, the Swedish economist Assar Lindbeck, a housing expert, said that "rent control appears to be the most efficient technique presently known to destroy a city – except for bombing". In 1989, Nguyễn Cơ Thạch, then Foreign Minister of Vietnam, observed, "The Americans couldn't destroy Hanoi, but we have destroyed our city by very low rents. We realized it was stupid and that we must change policy."

In a 1992 stratified, random survey of 464 US economists, economics graduate students, and members of the American Economic Association, 93% "generally agreed" or "agreed with provisos" that "A ceiling on rents reduces the quantity and quality of housing available." (Note: Alston, Kearl & Vaughan 1992, p. 204: "76.3% generally agreed, 16.6% agreed but with provisos") (Note: Krugman 2000: "The analysis of rent control is among the best-understood issues in all of economics, and – among economists, anyway – one of the least controversial. In 1992 a poll of the American Economic Association found 93 percent of its members agreeing that 'a ceiling on rents reduces the quality and quantity of housing'.")

A 2009 review of the economic literature (Note: Jenkins 2009, p. 106: "If rent-control is such a 'no-brainer', why bother to scrutinize the literature? The cluster of restrictions persists in roughly 140 jurisdictions in the United States as of 2001. As Hazlett (1982) notes, 'economists have been notoriously thorough in convincing themselves of the destructive effects of rent control and notoriously inept at convincing anyone else' (278). Better understanding of the issue might help correct the error, prevent other governments from falling into it, and promote an understanding among more than just economists. Also, better understanding is an end in itself.") by Blair Jenkins through EconLit covering theoretical and empirical research on multiple aspects of the issue, including housing availability, maintenance and housing quality, rental rates, political and administrative costs, and redistribution, for both first generation and second generation rent control systems, found that "the economics profession has reached a rare consensus: Rent control creates many more problems than it solves". (Note: Jenkins 2009, p. 105: "My review of the rent-control literature indexed by EconLit (or cited by such indexed articles) finds that economic research quite consistently and predominantly frowns on rent control. ... As Navarro (1985) notes, 'the economics profession has reached a rare consensus: Rent control creates many more problems than it solves' (90).") (Note: Tatian 2013: "In a comprehensive overview of the research literature, Blair Jenkins examined studies of different aspects of first-generation rent control (strict price ceilings) and second-generation (limits on increases, also referred to as rent stabilization). The upshot is that, at best, rent control does little harm but probably not much good and, at worst, it has negative impacts on landlords and tenants. There is near universal agreement that strict price ceilings, such as the kind imposed in New York City in the 1940s, are always bad because they severely inhibit housing production and investment. Even those most sympathetic to rent control seem to agree with this.") (Note: Beyer 2015: "Bad ideas die hard, and rent control is no exception. For several decades, there has been near-consensus [the author links to the Blair Jenkins study on the words 'near-consensus'] among economists that laws which cap or regulate rents are counterproductive, and most cities have ended them.") (Note: Valdez 2017: "Rent control is one of those policies that feels good—who doesn't want to set price by fiat (I only want to pay $3.00 for this sandwich)—but it is fundamentally flawed. It has been a few years now, but Blair Jenkins has written a review of the economics literature and quotes an economist who says, 'the economics profession has reached a rare consensus: Rent control creates many more problems than it solves'.")

In a 2012 poll of 41 economists by the Initiative on Global Markets (IGM) Economic Experts Panel, which queried opinions on the statement "Local ordinances that limit rent increases for some rental housing units, such as in New York and San Francisco, have had a positive impact over the past three decades on the amount and quality of broadly affordable rental housing in cities that have used them", 13 members said they strongly disagreed, 20 disagreed, 1 agreed, and 7 either did not answer, were undecided, or had no opinion. (Note: Pender 2016: "A 2012 survey by the University of Chicago's Booth School of Business asked respected economists if they agreed that rent-control ordinances in cities such as New York and San Francisco have improved the quantity and quality of affordable rental housing over the past three decades. Eighty-one percent disagreed, 2 percent agreed and 9 percent were uncertain or had no opinion.") (Note: Matthews 2013: "The findings of consensus are usually predictable. Economists, sure enough, hate rent control, [In this article, the author hyperlinks to the 2012 Chicago poll on the words rent contol.] licensing requirements and the gold standard, love free trade (including with China), high-skilled immigration, congestion pricing and carbon taxes, and think the Laffer curve is a bunch of baloney. Other answers are more surprising. The panelists lean toward supporting tougher capital requirements on big banks and backing the 2009 stimulus package, and, by a wide margin, back increasing the minimum wage to $9 an hour and indexing it to inflation. The results don't always map easily onto U.S. political divides.")

In David Sims's 2007 study of the deregulation of the housing market in Cambridge, Massachusetts, he found that "rent control had little effect on the construction of new housing but did encourage owners to shift units away from rental status and reduced rents substantially."

Paul Krugman writes that rent control inhibits construction of new housing, creates bitter tenant–landlord relations, and in markets with not all apartments under rent control, causes an increase in rents for uncontrolled units.

Thomas Sowell wrote in 2008 that rent control reduces the supply of housing, (Note: Sowell 2008, p. 4: "Rent control, for example, has been imposed in various cities around the world, with the intention of helping tenants. Almost invariably, landlords and builders of housing find the reduced range of terms less acceptable and therefore supply less housing. ... In other words, while landlords and builders simply lost an opportunity to make as much money as they could have otherwise, many tenants lost an opportunity to find a decent place to live.) and has stated that rent control increases urban blight. (Note: Sawhill 1999: "You aren't a fan of rent control? No, I'm not. A figure I ran across recently that struck me as illustrating the moral bankruptcy of rent control is this: The number of boarded-up housing units in New York City is four times the number of homeless people on the streets. To think of that! On winter nights there are people sleeping on the cold pavement and dying of exposure, when there are these buildings that are boarded up as a consequence of economic protectionism.")

In 1994, San Francisco voters passed a ballot initiative which expanded the city's existing rent control laws to include small multi-unit apartments with four or fewer units, built prior to 1980 (about 30% of the city's rental housing stock at the time). (Note: Diamond, McQuade & Qian 2017, p. 7: "These small multi-family structures made up about 30% of the rental housing stock in 1990...") (Note: Murphy 2017: "When San Francisco residents voted in 1994 to expand the city's rent-control policies, they granted protections to legions of renters living in duplexes and other small, 'mom and pop' apartment buildings constructed before 1980 – 30 percent of the city's rental housing stock.") (Note: Truong 2017: "Rent control started in San Francisco in 1979, when economic pressures and the passage of Prop. 13, which limited property tax increases, led then-Mayor Dianne Feinstein to sign the policy into law for properties built before 1980. An exemption was given to 'mom and pop' landlords, or owner-occupied buildings with four or less units. These made up around 30 percent of the city's rental housing stock at the time. To skirt rent control, large corporations starting buying up those properties and selling a portion back to a live-in representative. This in turn led to a successful ballot initiative in 1994 to remove the exemption. The Stanford researchers looked at the effects on tenants who received rent control because of the ballot initiative versus tenants living in similar properties who were not subject to the new rule.") A 2019 study found that San Francisco's rent control laws resulted in landlords removing 30% of the rent controlled units from the rental market (by conversion to condos or TICs) which led to a 15% citywide decrease in total rental units, and a 7% increase in citywide rents. (Note: Delgadillo 2018: "The report focused on San Francisco, where a 1994 ballot measure expanded rent control to certain smaller multifamily apartment buildings constructed before 1980. Because units built after 1980 were not included in the expansion, the result was what researchers call a 'natural experiment' in which the newer units could act as a control group. The researchers then tracked tenants' housing as well as changes in the housing stock and rents.") (Note: Misra 2018: "The researchers examined the impact of a 1994 ballot initiative in San Francisco, extending rent control protections to certain smaller buildings built before 1980. Its passage created a natural opportunity to compare these buildings with similar ones built in the period after that were not rent controlled. Diamond and her colleagues followed the landlords and the tenants in these buildings over time.")

=== On low income renters ===
In a 2013 analysis of the body of economic research on rent control by Peter Tatian at the Urban Institute, he stated that "The conclusion seems to be that rent stabilization doesn't do a good job of protecting its intended beneficiaries—poor or vulnerable renters—because the targeting of the benefits is very haphazard", and concluded that: "Given the current research, there seems to be little one can say in favor of rent control."

A 2016 study by NYU's Furman Center takes a more positive view on rent regulation, especially as a tool to slow gentrification: "Although rent regulation is ill-targeted if viewed as a purely redistributional program, as a program to promote longer-term lower rent tenancies for the tenants who benefit from it, even in hot rental markets, it seems to succeed."

A 2021 Columbia Business School study found that there are benefits to rent regulation, arguing that "the housing stability they provide disproportionately benefits low-income households. These insurance benefits trade off against the aggregate and spatial distortions in housing and labor markets that accompany such policies."

== Alternatives ==
The government can prevent rent inflation with fiscal policy and regulatory changes to increase housing supply or reduce demand.

To address the challenges lower-income individuals and families face in securing affordable housing, research points to more effective interventions. According to a research review by Lisa Sturtevant, key strategies include increasing federal housing vouchers and expanding the Low-Income Housing Tax Credit (LIHTC) program, both of which are seen as more promising for creating affordable housing options.

The libertarian think tank Reason Foundation identifies, next to housing vouchers, less restrictive zoning and building regulations as a key alternative to improve housing affordability. They argue that these regulations inflate development costs, thus limiting the availability of affordable rental units. Reducing these regulatory burdens and simplifying approval procedures will encourage new construction and expand the housing supply.

== History ==
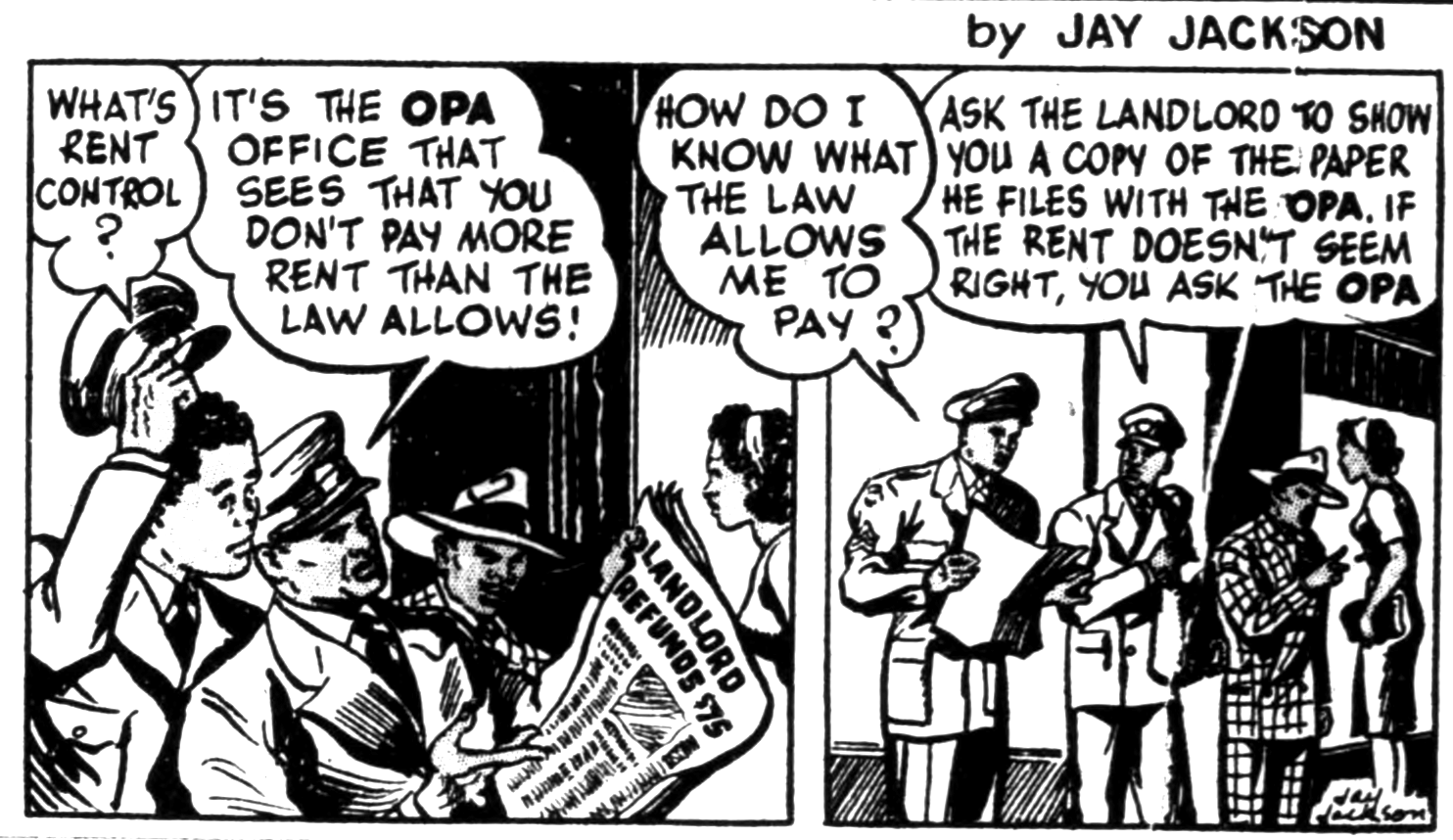
A 1945 comic explaining rent control under the U.S. Office of Price Administration

=== Early modern Europe ===
Rent control was used in Rome as early as 1470 to protect Jewish residents from price gouging. Since Jews in the Papal States were forbidden to own property, they were dependent on Christian landlords, who charged them high rents. In 1562, Pope Pius IV granted Jews the right to own property worth up to 1,500 Roman scudi and enacted rent stabilization. In 1586, Pope Sixtus V issued a bull ordering landlords to rent out houses to Jewish tenants at reasonable rates.

== By country ==
Rent control by country No rent control Law caps annual rent increases Law caps the annual rent as a percentage of housing's value Stripes indicate policy only applying to some cities

=== Australia ===
Rental regulations are administered by the state and territory governments. Rent control and freezes were features of the First and Second World War, the Great Depression, and the early stages of the COVID-19 pandemic.

==== Australian Capital Territory ====
The Australian Capital Territory (ACT) is the only jurisdiction with regulation specifying maximum rent increases. Rents can only be increased for sitting tenants once a year by a maximum of 110% of the consumer price index for the cost of rent in the ACT. Rents between tenancies are not regulated, and are allowed to rise to market rate upon vacancy (vacancy decontrol). Rent increases above the amount prescribed by regulation may be disputed by application to the ACT Civil and Administrative Tribunal (ACAT). Other Australian jurisdictions allow for rent increases every six to twelve months with variable notice periods.

==== New South Wales ====
New South Wales has a small number of tenants who are not covered by the Residential Tenancies Act 2010 (NSW), but rather continuing provisions of the repealed Landlord and Tenant (Amendment) Act 1948 (NSW). Such "protected tenants" pay a regulated "fair rent" set either through a Section 17A agreement registered with NSW Fair Trading, or a magistrate sitting as the Fair Rents Board (NSW).

=== Canada ===
In Canada, there are rent regulation laws in each province. For example, in Ontario the Residential Tenancies Act 2006 requires that prices for rented properties do not rise more than 2.5 percent each year, or a lower figure fixed by a government minister.

=== China ===
China announced in August 2021 new nationwide rent regulations that cap maximum yearly rent increases to 5% in all urban areas, which comprise over 2/3 of the population and include most of the ~250 million renters in the country.

=== Egypt ===
Rent controls were temporarily introduced in the 1920s in the wake of a housing shortage after World War I. The same happened after a housing shortage instigated price gouging during World War II, in an attempt to protect tenant rights. The controls reduced rent values of existing contracts by a certain percentage, leaving new contracts free of price controls so as not to disincentivise new build. The temporary controls were made permanent with Law 121/1947 which also added eviction controls by de-limiting rental terms which could only end if an owner needed the unit for own use, the building collapsed, non-payment, or other breaches of contract. Controls also allowed reporting of vacancy, allowing unused properties to be rented out if a tenant requested that. These became colloquially known as Old Rent.

In 1996, amid broader neoliberal structural adjustment, Law 4/1996 was introduced, known as New Rent, deregulating rental for all new contracts, while leaving Old Rent (rent control) contracts untouched, citing the risk of mass eviction and unrest.

In 2025, Law 164/2025 was ratified ending the rent control system, putting 1.6 million households, comprising 7% of all households in Egypt, in jeopardy of imminent eviction, and threatening to exacerbate existing housing problems. Under Old Rents approximately one third pay less than USD 1 (EGP 50) per month in rent. Rent for rent-regulated apartments will be allowed to rise by 10-20 times in the first year, than 15% for six further years before a final jump to market rate. One example given is a tenant who has lived in the same apartment since 1984 whose monthly rent will increase from (in US dollars) $0.82 to $123.60 (from 40 to 6,000 Egyptian pounds).

=== Finland ===
Finland phased out rent regulation for privately financed rental housing between 1991 and 1995.

=== France ===
Rent regulations are determined in France based on the Rent Reference Index, which serves as the basis for what landlords can increase yearly rents by. In July 2022, France introduced a new cap on yearly rent increase of a maximum of 3.5% for one year.

=== Germany ===
German rent regulation is found in the "Civil Code" (the Bürgerliches Gesetzbuch) in § 535 to § 580a. As common in German law, regulations are structured into an abstract, more general part that applies to all contracts of a certain type, followed by a more specific section for individual fields of application of this type of contract. Specific regulations for rental contracts governing apartments range from §§ 549 - 577a BGB.

The German law differentiates between the rental price at the starting point of the contract and rent increases throughout the duration of the contract. Generally, the rental price at the starting point of the contract is determined by the contractual agreement between the parties. Only in designated regions with a strained housing market, the rental price at the beginning of the rental agreement are capped by law. Increases in the rental prices throughout the duration of a rental contract are required to follow a "rent level" (Mietspiegel), which is a database of local reference rent prices. This collects all rent prices of new rental contracts of the past four years, and landlords may only increase prices on their property in line with rents in the same locality. Usury Rents are prohibited altogether, so that any price rises above 20 per cent over three years are unlawful.

Tenants may be evicted against their will through a court procedure for a good reason, and in the normal case only with a minimum of three months' notice. Tenants receive unlimited duration of their rental agreement unless the duration is explicitly halted. In practice, landlords have little incentive to change tenants as rental price increases beyond inflation are constrained. During the period of the tenancy, a person's tenancy may only be terminated for very good reasons. A system of rights for the rental property to be maintained by the landlord is designed to ensure quality of housing. Many states, such as Berlin, have a constitutional right to adequate housing, and require buildings to make dwelling spaces of a certain size and ceiling height.

In 2020, Berlin implemented a rent freeze, which was unprecedented in the German housing market. It benefitted sitting renters, but it substantially reduced the supply of new housing, harming those looking for a dwelling. The rent freeze was repealed in 2021.

=== Mexico ===
Mexico City decreed a rent freeze in 1942, which continues today though by 1976 it affected less than 1% of homes in the city. In 1943, Puebla introduced an extraordinary tax on landlords increasing the rent and in Jalisco some rents were frozen in 1942.

In February 1985, a new decree limited rent increase to 85 percent of minimum salary rise.

=== Netherlands ===
Yearly rent increases in the Netherlands are capped at a maximum of inflation + 1%, calculated as 3.3% in 2022.

=== Spain ===
The Catalonia region of Spain passed a rent-regulation law in September 2020.

=== Sweden ===
The OECD has considered Sweden’s rent regulation to be one of the strictest among developed countries.

=== United Kingdom ===
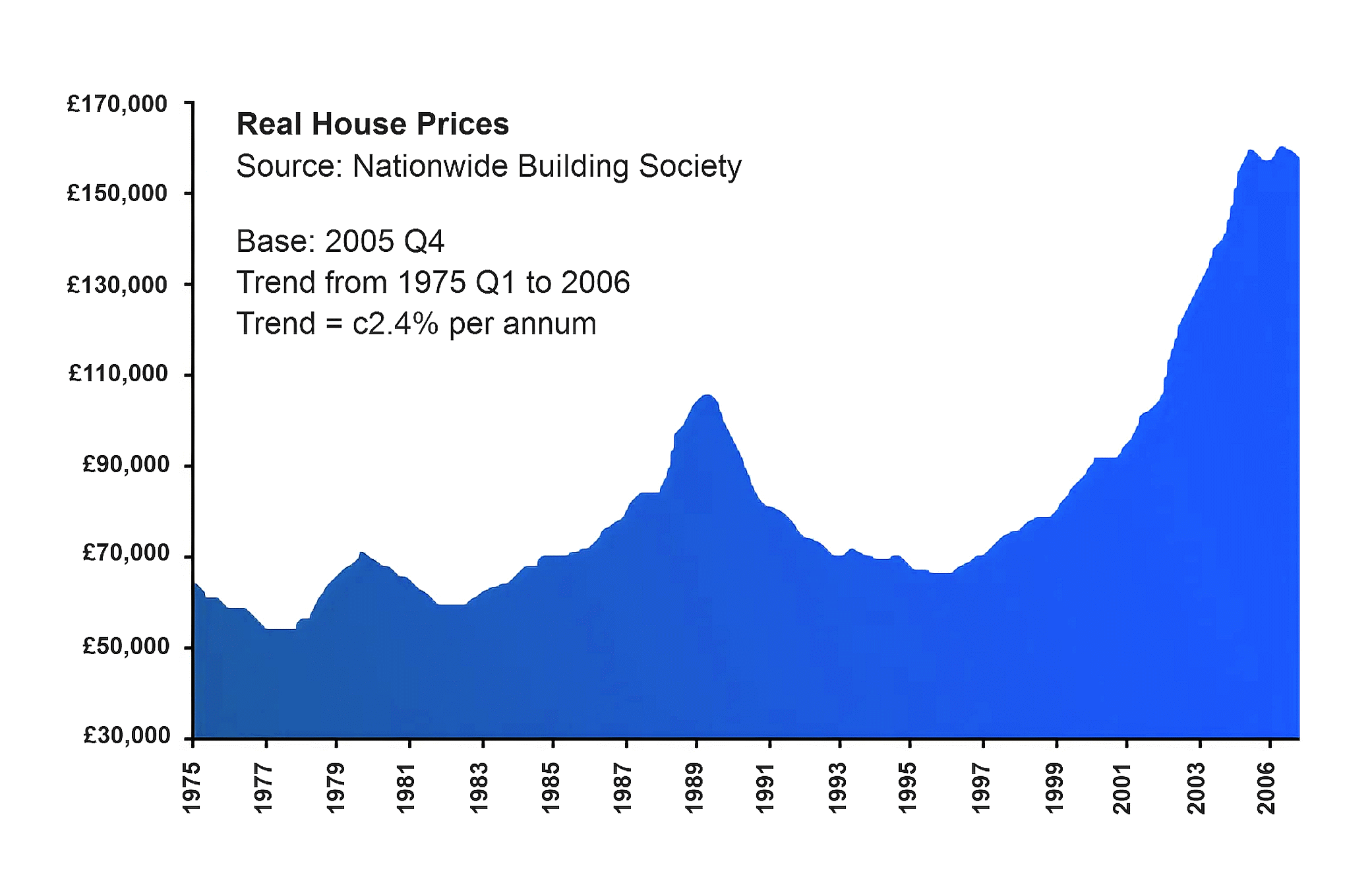
UK house prices (1975–2006)

Rent regulation covered the whole of the UK private sector rental market from 1915 to 1980. However, from the Housing Act 1980, it became Conservative Party policy to deregulate and dismantle rent regulation. Regulation for all new tenancies was abolished by the Housing Act 1988, leaving the basic regulatory framework was "freedom of contract" by the landlord to set any price. Rent regulations survive among a small number of council houses, and often the rates set by local authorities mirror escalating prices in the non-regulated private market.

The Renters' Rights Act 2025 introduces limited rent regulation to the private rented sector in England from 1 May 2026, restricting landlords to one rent increase per year and requiring at least two months' notice via a prescribed form. Tenants may challenge excessive increases through the First-tier Tribunal.

=== United States ===
Rent regulation in the United States is an issue for each state. In 1921, the US Supreme Court case of Block v. Hirsh held that regulation of rents in the District of Columbia as a temporary emergency measure was constitutional, but shortly afterward in 1924 in Chastleton Corp v. Sinclair the same law was unanimously struck down by the Supreme Court. After the 1930s New Deal, the Supreme Court ceased to interfere with social and economic legislation, and many states adopted rules. In the 1986 case of Fisher v. City of Berkeley, the US Supreme court held that there was no incompatibility between rent control and the Sherman Act.

Rent control existed in several Massachusetts communities from 1970 to 1994. During this time, at least 20% of all rent-controlled apartments in Cambridge housed the rich. The vast majority housed middle- and high-income earners. They included Frederik, Crown Prince of Denmark.

As of 2018, 4 states (California, New York, New Jersey, and Maryland) and the District of Columbia have localities in which some form of residential rent control is in effect (for normal structures, excluding mobile homes). 37 states either prohibit or preempt rent control, while 9 states allow their cities to enact rent control, but have no cities that have implemented it. For the localities with rent control, it often covers a large percentage of that city's stock of rental units: For example: in New York City in 2011, 45% of rental units were either "rent-stabilized" or "rent-controlled" (these are different legal classifications in NYC), (Note: Pereira 2015: "Rent stabilized units in 2011, according to a study by NYU's Furman Center. Rental units in the city: 2,172,634 Rent stabilized: 986,840 Rent controlled: 38,374") in the District of Columbia in 2014, just over 50% of rental units were rent-controlled, (Note: Weiner 2014: "According to the Department of Housing and Community Development, D.C. had about 79,000 rent-controlled units in 2011, out of 120,000 to 145,000 total rental units. This year, the Urban Institute estimates, 90,700 units in the city are potentially subject to rent control (there are a few exemptions that could reduce the number slightly), out of 177,600 total rental units.") in San Francisco, as of 2014, about 75% of all rental units were rent-controlled, (Note: Cutler 2014: "First off, understand the math of the region. San Francisco has a roughly thirty-five percent homeownership rate. Then 172,000 units of the city's 376,940 housing units are under rent control. (That's about 75 percent of the city's rental stock.)") and in Los Angeles in 2014, 80% of multifamily units were rent controlled. (Note: Bergman 2014: "Eighty percent of the 880,581 multifamily units in the city of Los Angeles are covered by rent control, according to the Los Angeles Housing and Community Investment Department.")

In 2019 California passed a statewide rent cap for the next 10 years which limits yearly rent increases to 5% plus regional inflation.

In 2019 Oregon's legislature passed a bill which made the state the first in the nation to adopt a state-wide rent control policy. This law limits annual rent increases to inflation plus 7 percent, includes vacancy decontrol (market rate between tenancies), exempts new construction for 15 years, and maintains the state ban on local rent control policies (state level preemption). (Note: Ingber 2019: "The bill would limit rent increases to 7 percent each year, in addition to inflation. Subsidized rent would be exempted, as would new construction for 15 years. If tenants leave their residences of their own volition, landlords would be able to increase the rent without a cap.") (Note: Njus 2019: "The law caps annual rent increases to 7 percent plus inflation throughout the state, which amounts to a limit of just over 10 percent this year. ... The rent increase restrictions exempt new construction for 15 years, and landlords may raise rent without any cap if renters leave of their own accord. ... with only perfunctory opposition from landlord groups, who viewed it as a better alternative to removing the state's ban on local rent control policies. The new law keeps the ban in place.")

In November 2021, voters in Saint Paul, Minnesota passed a rent control ballot initiative which capped annual rent increases at 3 percent, included vacancy control, and did not exempt new construction, nor allow inflation to be added to the allowable rate increase. This was followed by an 80% reduction in requests for new multifamily housing permits, while in neighboring Minneapolis, where voters authorized the city council to craft a rent control ordinance, yet to be enacted—which may exempt new construction from the rent control caps—permits were up 68%.

== See also ==
- Affordable housing
- Freedom of contract
- Inequality of bargaining power
- Housing inequality
- Just cause eviction
- NIMBY
- Public housing
- Subsidized housing
- YIMBY movement
