= Newberry v. United States =

1921 United States Supreme Court case

- Supreme Court of the United States

Argued January 7, 10, 1921 Decided May 2, 1921
- Full case name: Newberry, et al. v. United States
- Citations: 256 U.S. 232 (more) 41 S. Ct. 469; 65 L. Ed. 913; 1921 U.S. LEXIS 1632

Case history
- Prior: Error to the District Count of the U.S. for the Western District of Michigan

Holding
- Authority to control party primaries or conventions for designating candidates not bestowed on Congress by U.S. Constitution.

Court membership
- Chief Justice Edward D. White Associate Justices Joseph McKenna · Oliver W. Holmes Jr. William R. Day · Willis Van Devanter; Mahlon Pitney · James C. McReynolds; Louis Brandeis · John H. Clarke

Case opinions
- Majority: McReynolds, joined by Holmes, Day, Van Devanter; McKenna (in part)
- Concurrence: McKenna (in part)
- Concur/dissent: White
- Concur/dissent: Pitney, joined by Brandeis, Clarke

Laws applied
- Federal Corrupt Practices Act; 1913 Mich. Pub. Acts 109, Sec. 1; U.S. Const. Art. I, Sec. 4; U.S. Const., 17th Amend.
- Superseded by
- United States v. Classic (1941)

Newberry v. United States, 256 U.S. 232 (1921), is a decision by the United States Supreme Court which held that the United States Constitution did not grant the United States Congress the authority to regulate political party primaries or nomination processes. The court struck down 1911 amendments to the Federal Corrupt Practices Act which placed spending limits on candidate and political election committee spending in primaries or other nomination processes for federal office.

== Background ==
With a shift in public opinion for pro-campaign finance reform legislation during the Progressive Era, Congress enacted the Tillman Act in 1907, which banned direct corporate financing of political campaigns. This was followed with the enactment of the Federal Corrupt Practices Act (FCPA) of 1910, which was amended in 1911; providing two limitations on expenditures in federal elections. The first was that no candidate for Congress shall, in procuring his nomination and election, spend any sum in excess of the amount provided for by state law. The second was that no candidate for the United States House of Representatives shall spend more than $5,000 in any campaign for nomination and election, and that no candidate for United States Senate shall spend more than $10,000 in any campaign for his nomination and election.

Michigan law (Act No. 109, § 1, 1913) prohibited candidates for federal office from expending more than 25 percent of his anticipated federal salary for the purposes of securing his nomination, and another 25 percent of his anticipated federal salary on the general election. At the time, this amounted to about $3,750 in each phase of the electoral process.

Truman Handy Newberry was a Michigan businessman and former Secretary of the Navy who decided to run for the U.S. Senate as a Republican in 1918. His primary opponent was Henry Ford, the legendary automobile manufacturer. The primary was hotly contested, and Newberry was alleged to have spent upwards of $100,000 on his nomination race. Newberry defeated Ford, and went on to win the general election. Ford challenged Newberry and used his federal connections to win an investigation by Congress and the United States Department of Justice. Newberry was tried in 1921 and convicted.

Newberry appealed his conviction to the U.S. Supreme Court, arguing that the FCPA was unconstitutional.

== Decision ==
Writing for the majority, Justice James Clark McReynolds held that the U.S. Constitution did not grant Congress the power to regulate primary elections or political party nomination processes. The power of Congress over federal elections, McReynolds said, has its source solely in Article I, Section 4, of the Constitution. The Seventeenth Amendment, promulgated in May 1913, neither instituted nor required a new meaning of the term "election" and so did not modify Article I, Section 4. Primaries, McReynolds argued, are definitely not elections for office.

Neither a plain reading of the Constitution nor the meaning ascribed to them by the framers of the Constitution permits any other conclusion, he said. Moreover, Congress does not need to regulate primaries and nomination procedures in order to effectively perform its duties under Article I, Section 4. To infer such a power, McReynolds found, would infringe on the rights of the states and the people.

Justice Joseph McKenna concurred in part. He agreed with the majority that the FCPA was unconstitutional prior to the adoption of the Seventeenth Amdendment. However, he reserved judgment as to whether the Act was constitutional after adoption of the amendment.

Justice Mahlon Pitney concurred in part. He was joined in part by Justices Louis D. Brandeis and John Hessin Clarke. Pitney argued that there was no constitutional infirmity in congressional regulation of primary elections. However, he concluded that the district court's instructions to the jury were in error. He would have reversed, with directions for a new trial.

Chief Justice White, dissenting but concurring with a modification in the judgment of reversal, found no constitutional infirmity. He called the idea that "the nominating primary is one thing and the election another and different thing... a suicidal one." He also argued that the record of the passage of the Seventeenth Amendment by Congress indicated that Congress intended for the amendment to permit the regulation of primaries and political party nominations. White, too, found an error in the district court's jury instruction, and would have reversed and remanded on that basis.

In an investigation after the court's ruling, the U.S. Senate found that Newberry had not violated the FCPA. The Senate seated him but expressed disapproval of the sum spent in his primary campaign. In the face of a new movement to unseat him, Newberry resigned from the Senate on November 18, 1922.

== See also ==
- United States v. Classic
