= United States v. Classic =

- Supreme Court of the United States

Argued April 7, 1941 Decided May 26, 1941
- Full case name: United States v. Classic, et al.
- Citations: 313 U.S. 299 (more) 61 S. Ct. 1031; 85 L. Ed. 1368; 1941 U.S. LEXIS 601

Case history
- Prior: 35 F. Supp. 66 (E.D. La. 1940); probable jurisdiction noted, 61 S. Ct. 443 (1941).
- Subsequent: Rehearing denied, 314 U.S. 707 (1941).

Holding
- U.S. Const. art. 1, Sec. 4 empowers Congress to protect rights of electors in state primary elections; upheld Federal Corrupt Practices Act

Court membership
- Chief Justice Charles E. Hughes Associate Justices Harlan F. Stone · Owen Roberts; Hugo Black · Stanley F. Reed; Felix Frankfurter · William O. Douglas; Frank Murphy

Case opinions
- Majority: Stone, joined by Roberts, Reed, Frankfurter
- Dissent: Douglas, joined by Black, Murphy
- Hughes took no part in the consideration or decision of the case.

Laws applied
- U.S. Const. Art. I, Sec. 2; U.S. Const. Art. I, Sec. 4; 18 U.S.C.S. Sec. 51
- This case overturned a previous ruling or rulings
- Newberry v. United States (1921)

United States v. Classic, 313 U.S. 299 (1941), was a decision by the Supreme Court of the United States that the United States Constitution empowered Congress to regulate primary elections and political party nominations procedures, and that the constitutional "right of participation" extended to primary elections "is protected just as is the right to vote at the election, where the primary is by law made an integral part of the election machinery, whether the voter exercises his right in a party primary which invariably, sometimes or never determines the ultimate choice of the representative."

The case centered on a 1940 Democratic primary election in Louisiana, in which 26-year-old Hale Boggs was running for a seat in the House of Representatives. Five Boggs allies who worked as election commissioners were convicted of changing 97 votes for his primary opponents into votes for Boggs. (Boggs won the primary by more than 8,000 votes and went on to a long career in Congress, including stints as House majority leader and as a member of the Warren Commission.)

Many observers assumed that the court had already ruled in Newberry v. United States, that primary elections could not be regulated under the powers granted to Congress under Article I, Sec. 4 of the Constitution. But writing for the majority, Justice Harlan Fiske Stone argued that the Newberry court had been deeply divided on the issue and no majority had ruled one way or the other. Utilizing the reasoning by Chief Justice Edward Douglass White and Justice Mahlon Pitney in their concurrent opinions in Newberry, Stone argued that the Constitution's protection of the right to vote cannot be effectively exercised without reaching to primary elections and/or political party nominating procedures.

Though broadly noting that the constitutional right to vote extends to a party primary even when it "sometimes or never determines the ultimate choice of the representative," the Court offered no standard for determining whether a primary "was made an integral part of the election machinery." However, in Morse v. Republican Party of Virginia, the Court clarified that this extends to virtually all primaries, noting that "Virginia, like most States, has effectively divided its election into two stages, the first consisting of the selection of party candidates and the second being the general election.".

In a "diffident" dissent, Justice William O. Douglas agreed that the Constitution gives the Congress the right to regulate primaries, but concluded that the U.S. criminal code did not explicitly outlaw the actions in question. "It is not enough for us to find in the vague penumbra of a statute some offense about which Congress could have legislated, and then to particularize it as a crime because it is highly offensive," Douglas wrote. "Sec. 19 does not purport to be an exercise by Congress of its power to regulate primaries."

== See also ==
- List of United States Supreme Court cases, volume 313
