= Tillman Act of 1907 =

US federal campaign finance law

- Long title: An Act to prohibit corporations from making money contributions in connection with political elections.
- Nicknames: Corporate Donations Abolition Act of 1907
- Enacted by: the 59th United States Congress
- Effective: January 26, 1907

Citations
- Public law: 59-36
- Statutes at Large: 34 Stat. 864b

Legislative history
- Introduced in the Senate as S. 4563 by Benjamin Tillman (D-SC); Signed into law by President Theodore Roosevelt on January 26, 1907

The Tillman Act of 1907 (34 Stat. 864) was the first campaign finance law in the United States. The Act prohibited monetary contributions to federal candidates by corporations and nationally chartered (interstate) banks.

The Act was signed into law by President Theodore Roosevelt on January 26, 1907, and was named for its sponsor, South Carolina Senator Ben Tillman.

== Background ==
In 1905, a New York state investigation into ties between the major insurance companies and Wall Street banks accidentally discovered evidence that the New York Life Insurance Company had made a $48,700 ($1.75 million in modern dollars) contribution to Theodore Roosevelt's 1904 presidential campaign. This discovery was followed by daily revelations about other corporate contributions. The presidents of all the big insurance firms, and many of the smaller ones, testified that they had made corporate contributions to the Republican presidential campaigns of 1896, 1900, and 1904. "[I]t is obvious," The New York Times said, "that a deterrent, an actual prohibition, is needed to shut off the corrupting stream that flows from corporation treasuries."

The Times and the New York Daily Tribune both called on Congress to reintroduce a bill to prohibit corporate contributions that former New Hampshire Republican Senator William E. Chandler had drafted in 1901. With the investigation and the media focusing attention on his 1901 bill, Chandler tried to get one of his fellow Republicans to reintroduce it in the upcoming Fifty-Ninth Congress. When none of them agreed to do so, he turned to his old friend Tillman, who introduced the bill in the Senate. President Roosevelt joined the growing support for such a prohibition in his December 1905 message to Congress: "All contributions by corporations to any political committee or for any political purpose should be forbidden by law." Tillman got the Senate to pass the bill, without debate, in 1906, and the House passed it, also without debate, in 1907.

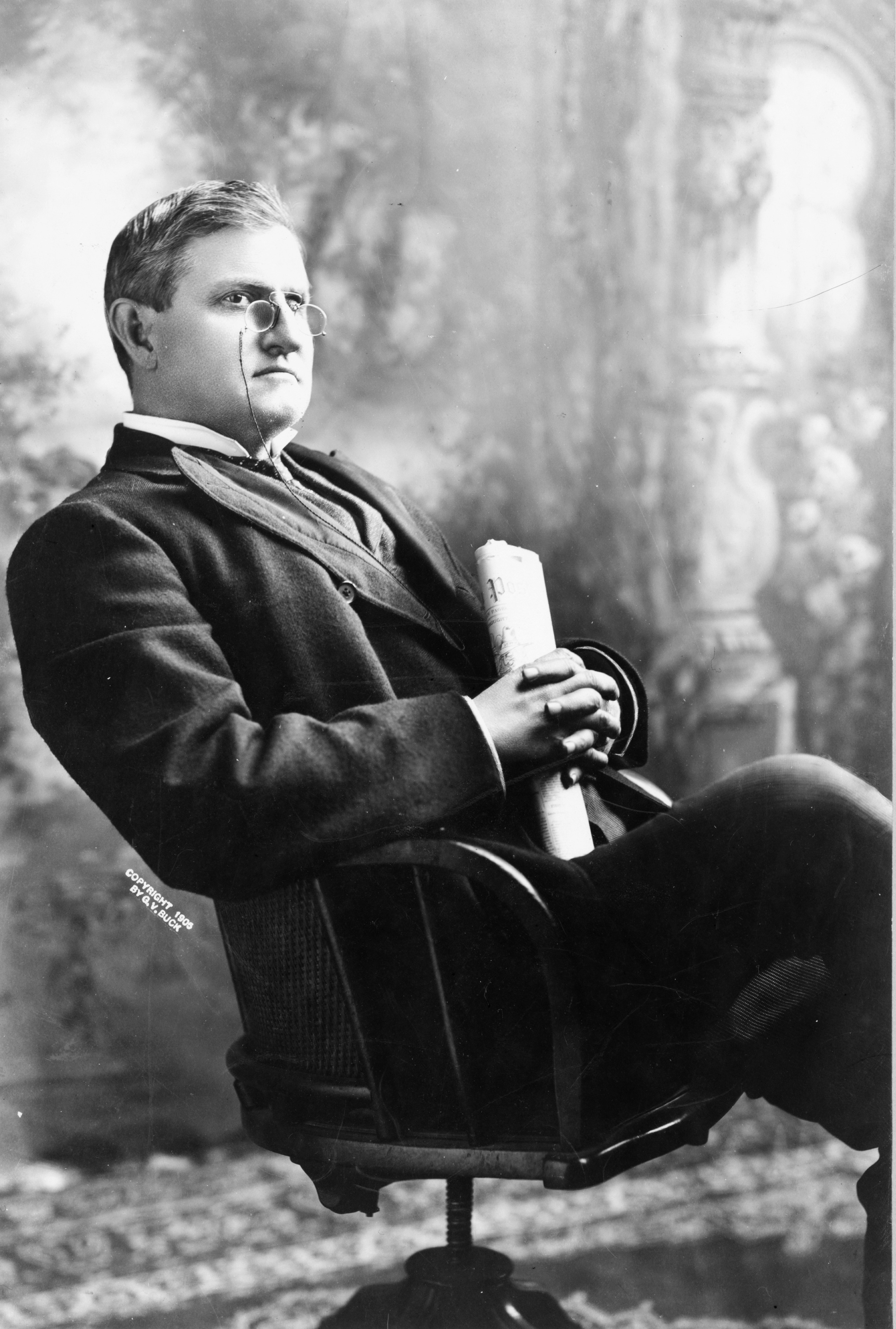
United States Senator Benjamin Tillman.

== Contents ==
Chandler's original bill had two provisions; the first would have prohibited any corporation engaged in interstate commerce from contributing to election campaigns at any level, national, state, or local; the second would have prohibited any corporation from contributing to presidential and congressional elections. (At the time that would have covered only elections to the House of Representatives; U.S. senators were not popularly elected until the adoption of the Seventeenth Amendment in 1913.) The bill that Congress passed in 1907 was more narrow in scope.

The Senate struck out the first provision, which rested on Congress's broad authority to regulate interstate commerce. The Senate instead prohibited corporate contributions based on Congress's authority to regulate elections to the House of Representatives. The final bill prohibited national banks and federally chartered corporations from contributing to election campaigns at any level, national, state, or local, and prohibited “any corporation whatever” from making contributions in elections for president and the House of Representatives.

== Impact ==
Most states soon passed their own laws banning corporate campaign contributions. The state laws were first tested with the rise of the Prohibition movement, when state governments sued breweries that had used corporate funds against ballot measures to ban the sale of alcoholic beverages. The first case brought under the Tillman Act, United States v. United States Brewers’ Association, 239 F. 163 (1916) , was also a Prohibition case, but it was about contributions to candidates for the U.S. Senate and House of Representatives. The breweries raised First Amendment objections to the state and federal laws, but the courts rejected them and upheld the laws.

== See also ==
- Campaign finance
- Campaign finance reform
- Miller v. American Telephone & Telegraph Co.
