= Federal Corrupt Practices Act =

United States federal law

- Other short titles: Publicity of Political Contributions Act of 1910
- Long title: An Act providing for publicity of contributions made for the purpose of influencing elections at which Representatives in Congress are elected.
- Nicknames: National Publicity Act
- Enacted by: the 61st United States Congress
- Effective: June 25, 1910

Citations
- Public law: Pub. L. 61–274
- Statutes at Large: 36 Stat. 822

Codification
- Titles amended: 2 U.S.C.: Congress
- U.S.C. sections created: 2 U.S.C. ch. 8 §§ 241-248

Legislative history
- Introduced in the House as H.R. 2250; Passed the House on April 15, 1910 (Passed); Passed the Senate on June 22, 1910 (37-30); Signed into law by President William H. Taft on June 25, 1910

The Federal Corrupt Practices Act, also known as the Publicity Act, was a federal law of the United States that was enacted in 1910 and amended in 1911 and 1925. It remained the nation's primary law regulating campaign finance in federal elections until the passage of the Federal Election Campaign Act in 1971. The Act was signed by President William Howard Taft on June 25, 1910.

The Act built upon the prohibition on corporate contributions in the Tillman Act of 1907 and was codified at 2 U.S.C. Section 241.

== Provisions ==
The Act established campaign spending limits for political parties in House general elections. It was the first federal law to require public disclosure of spending by political parties, but not candidates, by requiring national committees of political parties to file post-election reports on their contributions to individual candidates and their own expenditures. However, it covered only multi-state political parties and election committees, carried few penalties, and was rarely enforced.

== 1911 Amendments ==
On August 19, 1911, the Act was amended to extend it to Senate candidates and to primary elections. The amendments also required financial disclosure by candidates for the first time and established limits on the amount of money that candidates were allowed to spend on their campaigns. House campaign expenditures were limited to $5,000 and Senate expenditures to $10,000, but states could set lower limits.

However, the Supreme Court of the United States ruled, in Newberry v. U.S. 256 U.S. 232 (1921), that Congress's authority to regulate elections did not extend to party primaries or nominations and so struck down the spending limits in the 1911 amendment.

== 1925 Amendments ==
On February 28, 1925, the Act was revised and strengthened to extend its coverage to multi-state parties and election committees and to require financial disclosure reports to be made quarterly. Any contribution over $100 now had to be reported, and the Senate campaign spending limit was raised to $25,000.

However, the stronger version failed to provide for adequate regulation of campaign finance. The law provided for no regulatory authority to establish the manner of reporting or its disclosure to the public, and it set no penalties for failure to comply. The law did not regulate total contributions, which encouraged parties and donors to set up multiple committees and make multiple donations, all under $100, to evade the law's limits. Enforcement was left up to Congress, which rarely acted.

The US Supreme Court upheld the reporting requirements in Burroughs v. United States 290 U.S. 534 (1934).

In 1941, the Supreme Court, in United States v. Classic, 313 U.S. 299 (1941), upheld the spending limits in federal elections. It limited its ruling, however, by concluding that Congress's power to regulate extended only if state law made primaries and nominations part of the election and/or the primary effectively determined the outcome of the election.

== Repeal ==
The Act was repealed by the Federal Election Campaign Act of 1971, with effect on April 8, 1972.
