= List of statutory instruments of the United Kingdom, 2008 =

This is an incomplete list of statutory instruments of the United Kingdom in 2008.

== 1–100 ==
- Insolvency Practitioners and Insolvency Services Account (Fees) (Amendment) Order 2008 (S.I. 2008/3)
- Information as to Provision of Education (England) Regulations 2008 (S.I. 2008/4)
- Immigration and Police (Passenger, Crew and Service Information) Order 2008 (S.I. 2008/5)
- Textile Products (Indications of Fibre Content) (Amendment) Regulations 2008 (S.I. 2008/6)
- Non-Domestic Rating (Demand Notices) (Wales) (Amendment) Regulations 2008 (S.I. 2008/7)
- Immigration, Asylum and Nationality Act 2006 (Data Sharing Code of Practice) Order 2008 (S.I. 2008/8)
- Transfrontier Shipment of Waste (Amendment) Regulations 2008 (S.I. 2008/9)
- Planning and Compulsory Purchase Act 2004 (Commencement No. 4 and Consequential, Transitional and Savings Provisions) (Wales) (Amendment No.1) Order 2008 (S.I. 2008/10)
- Trade Marks and Trade Marks (Fees) (Amendment) Rules 2008 (S.I. 2008/11)
- Jobseeker's Allowance (Joint Claims) Amendment Regulations 2008 (S.I. 2008/13)
- Social Security (Industrial Injuries) (Prescribed Diseases) Amendment Regulations 2008 (S.I. 2008/14)
- Textile Products (Determination of Composition) Regulations 2008 (S.I. 2008/15)
- Safeguarding Vulnerable Groups Act 2006 (Barred List Prescribed Information) Regulations 2008 (S.I. 2008/16)
- Childcare Act 2006 (Commencement No. 1) (Wales) Order 2008 (S.I. 2008/17)
- Assembly Learning Grants (European Institutions) (Wales) Regulations 2008 (S.I. 2008/18)
- Gambling Act 2005 (Advertising of Foreign Gambling) (Amendment) Regulations 2008 (S.I. 2008/19)
- Restriction of the Use of Certain Hazardous Substances in Electrical and Electronic Equipment Regulations 2008 (S.I. 2008/37)
- Armed Forces and Reserve Forces (Compensation Scheme) (Amendment) Order 2008 (S.I. 2008/39)
- Criminal Defence Service (Very High Cost Cases) Regulations 2008 (S.I. 2008/40)
- Fluorinated Greenhouse Gases Regulations 2008 (S.I. 2008/41)
- Miscellaneous Food Additives (Amendment) (England) Regulations 2008 (S.I. 2008/42)
- Hertsmere (Parish) Order 2008 (S.I. 2008/43)
- Consistent Financial Reporting (England) (Amendment) Regulations 2008 (S.I. 2008/46)
- Schools Forums (England) (Amendment) Regulations 2008 (S.I. 2008/47)
- Absent Voting (Transitional Provisions) (Scotland) Regulations 2008 (S.I. 2008/48)
- Manchester College (Incorporation) Order 2008 (S.I. 2008/49)
- Manchester College (Government) Regulations 2008 (S.I. 2008/50)
- Hill Farm Allowance Regulations 2008 (S.I. 2008/51)
- Stamp Duty Reserve Tax (Investment Exchanges and Clearing Houses) (The London Stock Exchange) Regulations 2008 (S.I. 2008/52)
- School Admission Appeals Code (Appointed Day) (England) Order 2008 (S.I. 2008/53)
- Education and Inspections Act 2006 (Commencement No. 1 and Saving Provisions) (Amendment) (England) Order 2008 (S.I. 2008/54)
- Safety of Sports Grounds (Designation) Order 2008 (S.I. 2008/55)
- Plastic Materials and Articles in Contact with Food (Lid Gaskets) (Wales) Regulations 2008 (S.I. 2008/56)
- Crime and Disorder Act 1998 (Additional Authorities) Order 2008 (S.I. 2008/78)
- Imperial College Healthcare National Health Service Trust (Trust Funds: Appointment of Trustees) Order 2008 (S.I. 2008/79)
- Common Agricultural Policy Single Payment and Support Schemes (Cross-compliance) (England) (Amendment) Regulations 2008 (S.I. 2008/80)
- European Communities (Lawyer's Practice and Services of Lawyers) (Amendment) Regulations 2008 (S.I. 2008/81)
- Police Authorities (Particular Functions and Transitional Provisions) Order 2008 (S.I. 2008/82)
- East Kent Hospitals National Health Service Trust (Transfer of Trust Property) Order 2008 (S.I. 2008/83)
- Condensed Milk and Dried Milk (England) (Amendment) Regulations 2008 (S.I. 2008/85)
- Environmental Protection (Controls on Ozone–Depleting Substances) (Amendment) Regulations 2008 (S.I. 2008/91)
- Ozone Depleting Substances (Qualifications) (Amendment) Regulations 2008 (S.I. 2008/97)
- UK Borders Act 2007 (Commencement No. 1 and Transitional Provisions) Order 2008 (S.I. 2008/99)
- William Parker School (Designation as having a Religious Character) Order 2008 (S.I. 2008/100)

== 101–200 ==
- Street Works (Registers, Notices, Directions and Designations) (Wales) Regulations 2008 (S.I. 2008/101)
- Street Works (Fixed Penalty) (Wales) Regulations 2008 (S.I. 2008/102)
- Greater London Authority Act 2007 (Commencement No. 2) Order 2008 (S.I. 2008/113)
- Family Proceedings Fees (Amendment) Order 2008 (S.I. 2008/115)
- Civil Proceedings Fees (Amendment) Order 2008 (S.I. 2008/116)
- Magistrates’ Courts Fees (Amendment) Order 2008 (S.I. 2008/117)
- London Skills and Employment Board (Establishment) Regulations 2008 (S.I. 2008/118)
- London Skills and Employment Board (Specified Functions) Order 2008 (S.I. 2008/119)
- Sheep and Goats (Records, Identification and Movement) (Wales) Order 2008 (S.I. 2008/130)
- Export Control (Democratic Republic of Congo) (Amendment) Order 2008 (S.I. 2008/131)
- Immigration (Employment of Adults Subject to Immigration Control) (Maximum Penalty) Order 2008 (S.I. 2008/132)
- Social Security (Contributions) (Amendment) Regulations 2008 (S.I. 2008/133)
- British Citizenship (Designated Service) (Amendment) Order 2008 (S.I. 2008/135)
- Control of School Premises (Wales) Regulations 2008 (S.I. 2008/136)
- Condensed Milk and Dried Milk (Wales) (Amendment) Regulations 2008 (S.I. 2008/137)
- Miscellaneous Food Additives and the Sweeteners in Food (Amendment) (Wales) Regulations 2008 (S.I. 2008/138)
- Wireless Telegraphy (Licence Charges) (Amendment) Regulations 2008 (S.I. 2008/139)
- Merchant Shipping (Liner Conferences) Act 1982 (Repeal) Regulations 2008 (S.I. 2008/163)
- Stamp Duty and Stamp Duty Reserve Tax (Investment Exchanges and Clearing Houses) (Eurex Clearing AG) (Amendment) Regulations 2008 (S.I. 2008/164)
- Water Resources (Abstraction and Impounding) (Amendment) Regulations 2008 (S.I. 2008/165)
- Immigration and Nationality (Fees)(Amendment) Order 2008 (S.I. 2008/166)
- Police and Criminal Evidence Act 1984 (Codes of Practice) Order 2008 (S.I. 2008/167)
- Collaboration Between Maintained Schools (Wales) Regulations 2008 (S.I. 2008/168)
- Childcare Act 2006 (Local Authority Assessment) (Wales) Regulations 2008 (S.I. 2008/169)
- Childcare Act 2006 (Provision of Information) (Wales) Regulations 2008 (S.I. 2008/170)
- Judicial Pensions and Retirement Act 1993 (Addition of Qualifying Judicial Offices) Order 2008 (S.I. 2008/171)
- Local Government and Public Involvement in Health Act 2007 (Commencement No. 2 and Savings) Order 2008 (S.I. 2008/172)
- Bradford (Electoral Changes) Order 2008 (S.I. 2008/173)
- Halton (Parish Electoral Arrangements) Order 2008 (S.I. 2008/174)
- Hertsmere (Parish Electoral Arrangements) Order 2008 (S.I. 2008/175)
- Maidstone (Electoral Changes) Order 2008 (S.I. 2008/176)
- South Cambridgeshire (Electoral Changes) Order 2008 (S.I. 2008/177)
- Uttlesford (Electoral Changes) Order 2008 (S.I. 2008/178)
- Newark and Sherwood (Parish) Order 2008 (S.I. 2008/179)
- North Norfolk (Parishes) Order 2008 (S.I. 2008/180)
- Electricity and Gas (Carbon Emissions Reduction) Order 2008 (S.I. 2008/188)
- Income-related Benefits (Subsidy to Authorities) Amendment Order 2008 (S.I. 2008/196)
- Passenger and Goods Vehicles (Recording Equipment) (Downloading and Retention of Data) Regulations 2008 (S.I. 2008/198)
- Fire and Rescue Authorities (Improvement Plans) (Wales) Order 2008 (S.I. 2008/199)

== 201–300 ==
- Copyright (Certification of Licensing Scheme for Educational Recording of Broadcasts) (Educational Recording Agency Limited) (Revocation and Amendment) Order 2008 (S.I. 2008/211)
- Independent Police Complaints Commission (Immigration and Asylum Enforcement Functions) Regulations 2008 (S.I. 2008/212)
- Firefighters’ Pension Scheme (England) (Amendment) Order 2008 (S.I. 2008/213)
- Firefighters’ Pension Scheme (Amendment) (England) Order 2008 (S.I. 2008/214)
- Education (School Teachers' Qualifications) (Amendment) (Wales) Regulations 2008 (S.I. 2008/215)
- Rating Lists (Valuation Date) (England) Order 2008 (S.I. 2008/216)
- Occupational Pension Schemes (Levy Ceiling – Earnings Percentage Increase) Order 2008 (S.I. 2008/217)
- Immigration and Nationality (Cost Recovery Fees)(Amendment) Regulations 2008 (S.I. 2008/218)
- Serious Crime Act 2007 (Commencement No.1) Order 2008 (S.I. 2008/219)
- Local Government (Politically Restricted Posts) (Wales) Regulations 2008 (S.I. 2008/220)
- Charity Tribunal Rules 2008 (S.I. 2008/221)
- Legal Services Act 2007 (Commencement No.1 and Transitory Provisions) Order 2008 (S.I. 2008/222)
- Social Security (National Insurance Numbers) Amendment Regulations 2008 (S.I. 2008/223)
- National Health Service (Functions of Strategic Health Authorities and Primary Care Trusts and Administration Arrangements) (England) (Amendment) Regulations 2008 (S.I. 2008/224)
- Petroleum Licensing (Production) (Seaward Areas) Regulations 2008 (S.I. 2008/225)
- Road Traffic (Permitted Parking Area and Special Parking Area) (County Borough of Wrexham) Order 2008 (S.I. 2008/226)
- Local Authorities (Alteration of Requisite Calculations) (England) Regulations 2008 (S.I. 2008/227)
- School Finance (England) Regulations 2008 (S.I. 2008/228)
- Armed Forces (Gurkha Pensions) (Amendment) Order 2008 (S.I. 2008/229)
- Port of Weston Harbour Revision Order 2008 (S.I. 2008/230)
- A556 (M) Motorway (M6 to M56 Link) and Connecting Roads Scheme 1996 (Revocation) Order 2008 (S.I. 2008/231)
- A556 (M) Motorway (M6 to M56 Link) and Supplementary Connecting Roads Scheme 1996 (Revocation) Order 2008 (S.I. 2008/232)
- A556 Trunk Road (Church Farm-Turnpike Wood, Over Tabley) Order 1996 (Revocation) Order 2008 (S.I. 2008/233)
- A556 Trunk Road (Turnpike Wood, Over Tabley-A56 Bowdon Roundabout) (Detrunking) Order 1996 (Revocation) Order 2008 (S.I. 2008/234)
- Education (Student Support) (Amendment) Regulations 2008 (S.I. 2008/235)
- Wireless Telegraphy (Exemption) (Amendment) Regulations 2008 (S.I. 2008/236)
- Wireless Telegraphy (Automotive Short Range Radar) (Exemption) (No. 2) (Amendment) Regulations 2008 (S.I. 2008/237)
- Local Government Pension Scheme (Transitional Provisions) Regulations 2008 (S.I. 2008/238)
- Local Government Pension Scheme (Administration) Regulations 2008 (S.I. 2008/239)
- Personal Injuries (NHS Charges) (Amounts) Amendment Regulations 2008 (S.I. 2008/252)
- Agricultural Holdings (Units of Production) (Wales) Order 2008 (S.I. 2008/253)
- Rent Repayment Orders (Supplementary Provisions) (Wales) Regulations 2008 (S.I. 2008/254)
- Payments into the Olympic Lottery Distribution Fund etc. Order 2008 S.I. 2008/255)
- Police (Promotion) (Amendment) Regulations 2008 (S.I. 2008/273)
- Berwick-upon-Tweed (Parishes) Order 2008 (S.I. 2008/290)
- Controlled Drugs (Drug Precursors) (Intra-Community Trade) Regulations 2008 (S.I. 2008/295)
- Controlled Drugs (Drug Precursors) (Community External Trade) Regulations 2008 (S.I. 2008/296)
- European Communities (Definition of Treaties) (Agreement on Enlargement of the European Economic Area) Order 2008 (S.I. 2008/297)
- Proceeds of Crime Act 2002 (Investigations in different parts of the United Kingdom) (Amendment) Order 2008 (S.I. 2008/298)
- Visiting Forces (Designation) Order 2008 (S.I. 2008/299)
- Judicial Committee (General Appellate Jurisdiction) Rules (Amendment) Order 2008 (S.I. 2008/300)

== 301–400 ==
- European Communities (Designation) Order 2008 (S.I. 2008/301)
- Proceeds of Crime Act 2002 (External Requests and Orders) (Amendment) Order 2008 (S.I. 2008/302)
- High Peak (Parishes) Order 2008 (S.I. 2008/303)
- Cotswold (Parishes) Order 2008 (S.I. 2008/304)
- Representation of the People (Scotland) (Amendment) Regulations 2008 (S.I. 2008/305)
- Serious Organised Crime and Police Act 2005 (Commencement No. 12) Order 2008 (S.I. 2008/306)
- Scottish Parliament (Elections etc.) (Amendment) Order 2008 (S.I. 2008/307)
- Countryside and Rights of Way Act 2000 (Commencement No. 15) Order 2008 (S.I. 2008/308)
- UK Borders Act 2007 (Commencement No. 2 and Transitional Provisions) Order 2008 (S.I. 2008/309)
- Immigration, Asylum and Nationality Act 2006 (Commencement No. 8 and Transitional and Saving Provisions) Order 2008 (S.I. 2008/310)
- Police and Justice Act 2006 (Commencement No. 7 and Savings Provision) Order 2008 (S.I. 2008/311)
- Policing Plan Regulations 2008 (S.I. 2008/312)
- Further Education and Training Act 2007 (Commencement No. 1) (England) Order 2008 (S.I. 2008/313)
- Site Waste Management Plans Regulations 2008 (S.I. 2008/314)
- Council Tax (Valuations, Alteration of Lists and Appeals) (England) Regulations 2008 (S.I. 2008/315)
- Council Tax (Electronic Communications) (England) Order 2008 (S.I. 2008/316)
- Local Government and Public Involvement in Health Act 2007 (Commencement No. 3, Transitional and Saving Provisions and Commencement No. 2 (Amendment)) Order 2008 (S.I. 2008/337)
- A4 Trunk Road (Bath to Bristol) (Detrunking) Order 2008 (S.I. 2008/342)
- Regulated Covered Bonds Regulations 2008 (S.I. 2008/346)
- Education (School Performance Information) (England) (Amendment) Regulations 2008 (S.I. 2008/364)
- Housing (Right to Buy) (Priority of Charges) (Wales) Order 2008 (S.I. 2008/371)
- Oxford (Parishes) Order 2008 (S.I. 2008/372)
- Companies (Revision of Defective Accounts and Reports) Regulations 2008 (S.I. 2008/373)
- Companies (Summary Financial Statement) Regulations 2008 (S.I. 2008/374)
- Environmental Noise (England) (Amendment) Regulations 2008 (S.I. 2008/375)
- Isle of Wight (Parishes) Order 2008 (S.I. 2008/376)
- Education (Budget Statements) (England) Regulations 2008 (S.I. 2008/377)
- Northern Ireland Arms Decommissioning Act 1997 (Amnesty Period) Order 2008 (S.I. 2008/378)
- Finance Act 2007 (Schedule 9) Order 2008 (S.I. 2008/379)
- Insurance Business Transfer Schemes (Amendment of the Corporation Tax Acts) Order 2008 (S.I. 2008/381)
- Community Investment Tax Relief (Accreditation of Community Development Finance Institutions) (Amendment) Regulations 2008 (S.I. 2008/383)
- Non-Domestic Rating (Unoccupied Property) (England) Regulations 2008 (S.I. 2008/386)
- Council Tax and Non-Domestic Rating (Demand Notices) (England) (Amendment) Regulations 2008 (S.I. 2008/387)
- Companies Act 2006 (Amendment) (Accounts and Reports) Regulations 2008 (S.I. 2008/393)
- Corporate Manslaughter and Corporate Homicide Act 2007 (Amendment of Schedule 1) Order 2008 (S.I. 2008/396)

== 401–500 ==
- Corporate Manslaughter and Corporate Homicide Act 2007 (Commencement No.1) Order 2008 (S.I. 2008/401)
- Serious Crime Act 2007 (Disclosure of Information by Revenue and Customs) Order 2008 (S.I. 2008/403)
- Healthy Start Scheme and Welfare Food (Amendment) Regulations 2008 (S.I. 2008/408)
- Small Companies and Groups (Accounts and Directors’ Report) Regulations 2008 (S.I. 2008/409)
- Large and Medium-sized Companies and Groups (Accounts and Reports) Regulations 2008 (S.I. 2008/410)
- Welfare Reform Act 2007 (Commencement No. 5) Order 2008 (S.I. 2008/411)
- Northumberland, Tyne and Wear National Health Service Trust (Transfer of Trust Property) Order 2008 (S.I. 2008/412)
- Producer Responsibility Obligations (Packaging Waste) (Amendment) Regulations 2008 (S.I. 2008/413)
- Local Authorities (Capital Finance and Accounting) (England) (Amendment) Regulations 2008 (S.I. 2008/414)
- Surrey Primary Care Trust (Transfer of Trust Property) Order 2008 (S.I. 2008/415)
- Dorset Primary Care Trust (Transfer of Trust Property) Order 2008 (S.I. 2008/416)
- Concessionary Bus Travel (Permits)(England) Regulations 2008 (S.I. 2008/417)
- Motor Cars (Driving Instruction) (Amendment) Regulations 2008 (S.I. 2008/419)
- Welsh Levy Board Order 2008 (S.I. 2008/420)
- Leeds (Parish) Order 2008 (S.I. 2008/421)
- Sevenoaks (Parishes) Order 2008 (S.I. 2008/422)
- District of South Lakeland (Electoral Changes) Order 2008 (S.I. 2008/423)
- Borough of Welwyn Hatfield (Electoral Changes) Order 2008 (S.I. 2008/424)
- Borough of Basingstoke and Deane (Electoral Changes) Order 2008 (S.I. 2008/425)
- Borough of Barrow-in-Furness (Electoral Changes) Order 2008 (S.I. 2008/427)
- Local Government (Non-Domestic Rating) (Consequential Amendments) (England) Order 2008 (S.I. 2008/428)
- Central Rating List (England) (Amendment) Regulations 2008 (S.I. 2008/429)
- Cornwall Partnership National Health Service Trust (Transfer of Trust Property) Order 2008 (S.I. 2008/430)
- Wildlife and Countryside Act 1981 (Variation of Schedule 5) (England) Order 2008 (S.I. 2008/431)
- Northern Rock plc Transfer Order 2008 (S.I. 2008/432)
- Dairy Produce Quotas (General Provisions) (Amendment) Regulations 2008 (S.I. 2008/438)
- Dairy Produce Quotas (Amendment) Regulations 2008 (S.I. 2008/439)
- North Bristol National Health Service Trust (Transfer of Trust Property) Order 2008 (S.I. 2008/440)
- Social Security (Claims and Payments) Amendment Regulations 2008 (S.I. 2008/441)
- Public Rights of Way (Combined Orders) (England) Regulations 2008 (S.I. 2008/442)
- Meat (Official Controls Charges) (England) Regulations 2008 (S.I. 2008/447)
- Fire and Rescue Authorities (Best Value Performance Indicators) (Wales) Order 2008 (S.I. 2008/450)
- Local Government and Public Involvement in Health Act 2007 (Commencement No. 4) Order 2008 (S.I. 2008/461)
- European Qualifications (Health and Social Care Professions) (Amendment) Regulations 2008 (S.I. 2008/462)
- Social Security (Local Authority Investigations and Prosecutions) Regulations 2008 (S.I. 2008/463)
- Prescription Only Medicines (Human Use) Amendment Order 2008 (S.I. 2008/464)
- Products of Animal Origin (Disease Control) (England) Regulations 2008 (S.I. 2008/465)
- Street Works (Fixed Penalty) (Wales) (Amendment) Regulations 2008 (S.I. 2008/466)
- Gambling (Inviting Competing Applications for Large and Small Casino Premises Licences) Regulations 2008 (S.I. 2008/469)
- Safeguarding Vulnerable Groups Act 2006 (Transitional Provisions) Order 2008 (S.I. 2008/473)
- Safeguarding Vulnerable Groups Act 2006 (Barring Procedure) Regulations 2008 (S.I. 2008/474)
- Local Authorities (Alteration of Requisite Calculations) (Wales) Regulations 2008 (S.I. 2008/476)
- Companies (Disclosure of Auditor Remuneration and Liability Limitation Agreements) Regulations 2008 (S.I. 2008/489)
- Wiltshire (Structural Change) Order 2008 (S.I. 2008/490)
- Cornwall (Structural Change) Order 2008 (S.I. 2008/491)
- Shropshire (Structural Change) Order 2008 (S.I. 2008/492)
- County Durham (Structural Change) Order 2008 (S.I. 2008/493)
- Northumberland (Structural Change) Order 2008 (S.I. 2008/494)
- Companies (Trading Disclosures) Regulations 2008 (S.I. 2008/495)
- Statutory Auditors (Delegation of Functions etc.) Order 2008 (S.I. 2008/496)
- Companies (Late Filing Penalties) and Limited Liability Partnerships (Filing Periods and Late Filing Penalties) Regulations 2008 (S.I. 2008/497)
- Social Security Pensions (Home Responsibilities) Amendment Regulations 2008 (S.I. 2008/498)
- Statutory Auditors and Third Country Auditors (Amendment) Regulations 2008 (S.I. 2008/499)

== 501–600 ==
- Oxford (Parish Electoral Arrangements) Order 2008 (S.I. 2008/501)
- Town and Country Planning (General Permitted Development) (Amendment) (Wales) Order 2008 (S.I. 2008/502)
- Local Government (Best Value Performance Indicators) (Wales) Order 2008 (S.I. 2008/503)
- Offender Management Act 2007 (Commencement No. 2 and Transitional Provision) Order 2008 (S.I. 2008/504)
- Immigration Services Commissioner (Designated Professional Body) (Fees) Order 2008 (S.I. 2008/505)
- Vehicle Drivers (Certificates of Professional Competence) (Amendment) Regulations 2008 (S.I. 2008/506)
- Greater London Authority Elections (Election Addresses) (Amendment) Order 2008 (S.I. 2008/507)
- Motor Vehicles (Driving Licences) (Amendment) Regulations 2008 (S.I. 2008/508)
- Education (Assisted Places) (Amendment) (Wales) Regulations 2008 (S.I. 2008/509)
- Education (Assisted Places) (Incidental Expenses) (Amendment) (Wales) Regulations 2008 (S.I. 2008/510)
- Car Fuel Benefit Order 2008 (S.I. 2008/511)
- Smoke Control Areas (Authorised Fuels) (England) Regulations 2008 (S.I. 2008/514)
- Smoke Control Areas (Exempted Fireplaces) (England) Order 2008 (S.I. 2008/515)
- Local Authorities (Functions and Responsibilities) (England) (Amendment) Regulations 2008 (S.I. 2008/516)
- Meat Products (England) (Amendment) Regulations 2008 (S.I. 2008/517)
- Aerodromes (Designation) (Chargeable Air Services) (Amendment) Order 2008 (S.I. 2008/518)
- Health and Social Care Information Centre (Transfer of Staff, Property and Liabilities) Order 2008 (S.I. 2008/519)
- Radioactive Contaminated Land (Modification of Enactments) (England) (Amendment) Regulations 2008 (S.I. 2008/520)
- Radioactive Contaminated Land (Modification of Enactments) (Wales) (Amendment) Regulations 2008 (S.I. 2008/521)
- Proceeds of Crime Act 2002 (Legal Expenses in Civil Recovery Proceedings) (Amendment) Regulations 2008 (S.I. 2008/523)
- Control of Salmonella in Poultry (Wales) Order 2008 (S.I. 2008/524)
- Blood Safety and Quality (Fees Amendment) Regulations 2008 (S.I. 2008/525)
- Local Government and Public Involvement in Health Act 2007 Consequential Provisions Order 2008 (S.I. 2008/526)
- Charities Act 2006 (Charitable Companies Audit and Group Accounts Provisions) Order 2008 (S.I. 2008/527)
- Local Involvement Networks Regulations 2008 (S.I. 2008/528)
- Education (Student Support) Regulations 2008 (S.I. 2008/529)
- Medical Devices (Fees Amendments) Regulations 2008 (S.I. 2008/530)
- Public Interest Disclosure (Prescribed Persons) (Amendment) Order 2008 (S.I. 2008/531)
- Education (Pupil Exclusions and Appeals) (Pupil Referral Units) (England) Regulations 2008 (S.I. 2008/532)
- Housing (Right to Buy) (Service Charges) (Amendment) (England) Order 2008 (S.I. 2008/533)
- Industrial Training Levy (Construction Industry Training Board) Order 2008 (S.I. 2008/534)
- Industrial Training Levy (Engineering Construction Industry Training Board) Order 2008 (S.I. 2008/535)
- Child Support (Miscellaneous Amendments) Regulations 2008 (S.I. 2008/536)
- Courts and Legal Services Act 1990 (Modification of Power to Make Rules about Licensed Conveyancers) Order 2008 (S.I. 2008/537)
- Assembly Learning Grant (Further Education) Regulations 2008 (S.I. 2008/538)
- Immigration, Asylum and Nationality Act 2006 (Duty to Share Information and Disclosure of Information for Security Purposes) Order 2008 (S.I. 2008/539)
- Street Works (Registers, Notices, Directions and Designations) (Wales) (No. 2) Regulations 2008 (S.I. 2008/540)
- Teachers’ Pensions (Miscellaneous Amendments) Regulations 2008 (S.I. 2008/541)
- Police Act 1997 (Criminal Records) (Disclosure) Regulations (Northern Ireland) 2008 (S.I. 2008/542)
- Honey (Wales) (Amendment) Regulations 2008 (S.I. 2008/543)
- Immigration and Nationality (Fees) (Amendment) Regulations 2008 (S.I. 2008/544)
- Education (Student Loans) (Repayment) (Amendment) Regulations 2008 (S.I. 2008/546)
- National Health Service (Dental Charges) Amendment Regulations 2008 (S.I. 2008/547)
- Medicines for Human Use (Prohibition) (Senecio and Miscellaneous Amendments) Order 2008 (S.I. 2008/548)
- Pendle (Parishes) Order 2008 (S.I. 2008/549)
- Town and Country Planning (General Development Procedure) (Amendment) (England) Order 2008 (S.I. 2008/550)
- Planning (Listed Buildings and Conservation Areas) (Amendment) (England) Regulations 2008 (S.I. 2008/551)
- Medicines (Products for Human Use-Fees) Regulations 2008 (S.I. 2008/552)
- National Health Service (Optical Charges and Payments) Amendment Regulations 2008 (S.I. 2008/553)
- Postgraduate Medical Education and Training Board (Fees) Rules Order 2008 (S.I. 2008/554)
- Control of School Premises (Wales) (Amendment) Regulations 2008 (S.I. 2008/555)
- Value Added Tax (Amendment) Regulations 2008 (S.I. 2008/556)
- Statistics of Trade (Customs and Excise) (Amendment) Regulations 2008 (S.I. 2008/557)
- NHS Professionals Special Health Authority (Establishment and Constitution) (Amendment) Order 2008 (S.I. 2008/558)
- Prevention of Terrorism Act 2005 (Continuance in force of sections 1 to 9) Order 2008 (S.I. 2008/559)
- Seed Potatoes (England) (Amendment) Regulations 2008 (S.I. 2008/560)
- Finance Act 2007 Section 46 (Commencement) Order 2008 (S.I. 2008/561)
- Income Tax (Purchased Life Annuities) Regulations 2008 (S.I. 2008/562)
- Defence Support Group Trading Fund Order 2008 (S.I. 2008/563)
- Insurance Accounts Directive (Miscellaneous Insurance Undertakings) Regulations 2008 (S.I. 2008/565)
- Tyne and Wear Fire and Rescue Authority (Increase in Number of Members) Order 2008 (S.I. 2008/566)
- Bank Accounts Directive (Miscellaneous Banks) Regulations 2008 (S.I. 2008/567)
- Finance Act 2007, Schedule 24 (Commencement and Transitional Provisions) Order 2008 (S.I. 2008/568)
- Partnerships (Accounts) Regulations 2008 (S.I. 2008/569)
- Supply of Information (Register of Deaths) (England and Wales) Order 2008 (S.I. 2008/570)
- National Health Service (Charges for Drugs and Appliances) and (Travel Expenses and Remission of Charges) Amendment Regulations 2008 (S.I. 2008/571)
- Home Information Pack (Amendment) Regulations 2008 (S.I. 2008/572)
- Employment Equality (Age) Regulations 2006 (Amendment) Regulations 2008 (S.I. 2008/573)
- Serious Organised Crime and Police Act 2005 and Serious Crime Act 2007 (Consequential and Supplementary Amendments to Secondary Legislation) Order 2008 (S.I. 2008/574)
- Assets Recovery Agency (Abolition) Order 2008 (S.I. 2008/575)
- Agriculture and Horticulture Development Board Order 2008 (S.I. 2008/576)
- National Health Service (Optical Charges and Payments) and (General Ophthalmic Services) (Amendment) (Wales) Regulations 2008 (S.I. 2008/577)
- Social Security (Contributions) (Re-rating) Order 2008 (S.I. 2008/579)
- Town and Country Planning (Mayor of London) Order 2008 (S.I. 2008/580)
- Guaranteed Minimum Pensions Increase Order 2008 (S.I. 2008/581)
- Greater London Authority Act 2007 (Commencement No. 3) Order 2008 (S.I. 2008/582)
- Companies (Cross-Border Mergers) (Amendment) Regulations 2008 (S.I. 2008/583)
- Powys (Communities) Order 2008 (S.I. 2008/584)
- A456 Trunk Road (Detrunking) Order 2008 (S.I. 2008/585)
- Housing Benefit (Local Housing Allowance, Information Sharing and Miscellaneous) Amendment Regulations 2008 (S.I. 2008/586)
- Rent Officers (Housing Benefit Functions) Amendment Order 2008 (S.I. 2008/587)
- Local Authorities (Capital Finance and Accounting) (Wales) (Amendment) Regulations 2008 (S.I. 2008/588)
- Street Works (Inspection Fees) (England) (Amendment) Regulations 2008 (S.I. 2008/589)
- FCO Services Trading Fund Order 2008 (S.I. 2008/590)
- Local Government and Public Involvement in Health Act 2007 (Commencement) (Wales) Order 2008 (S.I. 2008/591)
- Personal Injuries (Civilians) (Amendment) Scheme 2008 (S.I. 2008/592)
- National Assistance (Sums for Personal Requirements and Assessment of Resources) Amendment (England) Regulations 2008 (S.I. 2008/593)
- Water Supply and Sewerage Services (Customer Service Standards) Regulations 2008 (S.I. 2008/594)
- Town and Country Planning (Determination of Appeals by Appointed Persons) (Prescribed Classes) (Amendment) (England) Regulations 2008 (S.I. 2008/595)
- Prison (Amendment) Rules 2008 (S.I. 2008/597)
- Offender Management Act 2007 (Establishment of Probation Trusts) Order 2008 (S.I. 2008/598)
- Young Offender Institution (Amendment) Rules 2008 (S.I. 2008/599)
- Street Works (Inspection Fees) (Wales) (Amendment) Regulations 2008 (S.I. 2008/600)

== 601–700 ==
- Meat (Official Controls Charges) (Wales) Regulations 2008 (S.I. 2008/601)
- Kettering (Parish) Order 2008 (S.I. 2008/602)
- St Helens (Parish) Order 2008 (S.I. 2008/603)
- Tax Credits (Miscellaneous Amendments) Regulations 2008 (S.I. 2008/604)
- Inheritance Tax (Delivery of Accounts) (Excepted Transfers and Excepted Terminations) Regulations 2008 (S.I. 2008/605)
- Inheritance Tax (Delivery of Accounts) (Excepted Settlements) Regulations 2008 (S.I. 2008/606)
- Social Security (Contributions) (Amendment No. 2) Regulations 2008 (S.I. 2008/607)
- Civil Enforcement of Parking Contraventions (Representations and Appeals) (Wales) Regulations 2008 (S.I. 2008/608)
- Civil Enforcement of Parking Contraventions (Penalty Charge Notices, Enforcement and Adjudication) (Wales) Regulations 2008 (S.I. 2008/609)
- Electoral Administration Act 2006 (Commencement No. 6) Order 2008 (S.I. 2008/610)
- Public Trustee (Fees) Order 2008 (S.I. 2008/611)
- Removal and Disposal of Vehicles (Amendment) (Wales) Regulations 2008 (S.I. 2008/612)
- Civil Enforcement of Parking Contraventions (Guidelines on Levels of Charges) (Wales) Order 2008 (S.I. 2008/613)
- Civil Enforcement of Parking Contraventions (General Provisions) (Wales) Regulations 2008 (S.I. 2008/614)
- Civil Enforcement of Parking Contraventions (Representations and Appeals) Removed Vehicles (Wales) Regulations 2008 (S.I. 2008/615)
- Civil Enforcement Officers (Wearing of Uniforms) (Wales) Regulations 2008 (S.I. 2008/616)
- Police and Justice Act 2006 (Commencement No. 1, Transitional and Saving Provisions) (Amendment) Order 2008 (S.I. 2008/617)
- Brucellosis (England) (Amendment) Order 2008 (S.I. 2008/618)
- Police and Justice Act 2006 (Supplementary and Transitional Provisions) (Amendment) Order 2008 (S.I. 2008/619)
- Civil Enforcement of Parking Contraventions (Approved Devices) (Wales) Order 2008 (S.I. 2008/620)
- Discharge of Fines by Unpaid Work (Pilot Schemes) (Amendment) Order 2008 (S.I. 2008/621)
- Rice Products from the United States of America (Restriction on First Placing on the Market) (England) Regulations 2008 (S.I. 2008/622)
- Companies (Defective Accounts and Directors’ Reports) (Authorised Person) and Supervision of Accounts and Reports (Prescribed Body) Order 2008 (S.I. 2008/623)
- Occupational Pension Schemes (Non-European Schemes Exemption) Regulations 2008 (S.I. 2008/624)
- Local Government (Parishes and Parish Councils) (England) Regulations 2008 (S.I. 2008/625)
- Local Government Finance (New Parishes) (England) Regulations 2008 (S.I. 2008/626)
- Pensions Act 2004 (Commencement No. 11) Order 2008 (S.I. 2008/627)
- Defence Aviation Repair Agency Trading Fund (Amendment) Order 2008 (S.I. 2008/628)
- Charities (Accounts and Reports) Regulations 2008 (S.I. 2008/629)
- Police Authority Regulations 2008 (S.I. 2008/630)
- Metropolitan Police Authority Regulations 2008 (S.I. 2008/631)
- Social Security Benefits Up-rating Order 2008 (S.I. 2008/632)
- Penwith College, Penzance (Dissolution) Order 2008 (S.I. 2008/633)
- Cheshire (Structural Changes) Order 2008 (S.I. 2008/634)
- Criminal Procedure and Investigations Act 1996 (Application to the Armed Forces) Order 2008 (S.I. 2008/635)
- Social Security (Contributions) (Amendment No. 3) Regulations 2008 (S.I. 2008/636)
- Discretionary Financial Assistance (Amendment) Regulations 2008 (S.I. 2008/637)
- Gangmasters (Licensing Conditions) (No. 2) (Amendment) Rules 2008 (S.I. 2008/638)
- Export Control (Security and Para-military Goods) Order 2008 (S.I. 2008/639)
- Fostering Services (Amendment) Regulations 2008 (S.I. 2008/640)
- Disability Discrimination (Public Authorities) (Statutory Duties) (Amendment) Regulations 2008 (S.I. 2008/641)
- Road Vehicles (Registration and Licensing) (Amendment) Regulations 2008 (S.I. 2008/642)
- Communications (Television Licensing) (Amendment) Regulations 2008 (S.I. 2008/643)
- Plant Health (Forestry) (Amendment) Order 2008 (S.I. 2008/644)
- Consumer Credit (Exempt Agreements) (Amendment) Order 2008 (S.I. 2008/645)
- Farriers’ Qualifications (European Recognition) Regulations 2008 (S.I. 2008/646)
- Energy Performance of Buildings (Certificates and Inspections) (England and Wales) (Amendment) Regulations 2008 (S.I. 2008/647)
- Criminal Procedure and Investigations Act 1969 (Code of Practice) (Armed Forces) Order 2008 (S.I. 2008/648)
- Occupational Pension Schemes (Internal Dispute Resolution Procedures Consequential and Miscellaneous Amendments) Regulations 2008 (S.I. 2008/649)
- Pneumoconiosis etc. (Workers’ Compensation) (Payment of Claims) (Amendment) Regulations 2008 (S.I. 2008/650)
- Accounting Standards (Prescribed Body) Regulations 2008 (S.I. 2008/651)
- Diseases of Animals (Approved Disinfectants) (Fees) (England) Order 2008 (S.I. 2008/652)
- National Health Service Pension Scheme Regulations 2008 (S.I. 2008/653)
- National Health Service Pension Scheme (Amendment) Regulations 2008 (S.I. 2008/654)
- National Health Service Pension Scheme (Additional Voluntary Contributions) and National Health Service (Injury Benefits and Compensation for Premature Retirement) Amendment Regulations 2008 (S.I. 2008/655)
- Sex Discrimination Act 1975 (Amendment) Regulations 2008 (S.I. 2008/656)
- Education (Induction Arrangements for School Teachers) (England) Regulations 2008 (S.I. 2008/657)
- Community Legal Service (Financial) (Amendment) Regulations 2008 (S.I. 2008/658)
- Police Authorities (Best Value) Performance Indicators Order 2008 (S.I. 2008/659)
- National Health Service (Optical Charges and Payments) (Amendment) (Wales) Regulations 2008 (S.I. 2008/660)
- Occupational and Personal Pension Schemes (General Levy) (Amendment) Regulations 2008 (S.I. 2008/661)
- Insolvency (Scotland) Amendment Rules 2008 (S.I. 2008/662)
- Environmental Offences (Fixed Penalties) (Miscellaneous Provisions) (Wales) Regulations 2008 (S.I. 2008/663)
- Pension Protection Fund (Prescribed Payments) Regulations 2008 (S.I. 2008/664)
- Pesticides (Maximum Residue Levels in Crops, Food and Feeding Stuffs) (England and Wales) (Amendment) Regulations 2008 (S.I. 2008/665)
- Community Legal Service (Funding) (Counsel in Family Proceedings) (Amendment) Order 2008 (S.I. 2008/666)
- Social Security Benefits Up-rating Regulations 2008 (S.I. 2008/667)
- Consumer Credit Appeals Tribunal Rules 2008 (S.I. 2008/668)
- Rules of the Air (Amendment) Regulations 2008 (S.I. 2008/669)
- Insolvency (Amendment) Regulations 2008 (S.I. 2008/670)
- Building (Amendment) Regulations 2008 (S.I. 2008/671)
- Insolvency Practitioners and Insolvency Services Account (Fees) (Amendment) (No. 2) Order 2008 (S.I. 2008/672)
- Income Tax (Indexation) Order 2008 (S.I. 2008/673)
- Companies Act 2006 (Commencement No. 6, Saving and Commencement Nos. 3 and 5 (Amendment)) Order 2008 (S.I. 2008/674)
- Town and Country Planning (General Permitted Development) (Amendment) (England) Order 2008 (S.I. 2008/675)
- Consular Fees Order 2008 (S.I. 2008/676)
- Copyright and Performances (Application to Other Countries) Order 2008 (S.I. 2008/677)
- Transfer of Functions (Registration) Order 2008 (S.I. 2008/678)
- Naval, Military and Air Forces Etc. (Disablement and Death) Service Pensions (Amendment) Order 2008 (S.I. 2008/679)
- Immigration (Isle of Man) Order 2008 (S.I. 2008/680)
- Inspectors of Education, Children's Services and Skills Order 2008 (S.I. 2880/681)
- Financial Services and Markets Act 2000 (Exemption) (Amendment) Order 2008 (S.I. 2008/682)
- National Health Service (Pharmaceutical Services) (Amendment) Regulations 2008 (S.I. 2008/683)
- Immigration (Notices) (Amendment) Regulations 2008 (S.I. 2008/684)
- Dairy Produce Quotas (Wales) (Amendment) Regulations 2008 (S.I. 2008/685)
- Wireless Telegraphy (Licence Award) Regulations 2008 (S.I. 2008/686)
- Wireless Telegraphy (Limitation of Number of Spectrum Access Licences) Order 2008 (S.I. 2008/687)
- Wireless Telegraphy (Spectrum Trading) (Amendment) Regulations 2008 (S.I. 2008/688)
- Wireless Telegraphy (Register) (Amendment) Regulations 2008 (S.I. 2008/689)
- Companies (Mergers and Divisions of Public Companies) (Amendment) Regulations 2008 (S.I. 2008/690)
- Tope (Prohibition of Fishing) Order 2008 (S.I. 2008/691)
- Police Act 1997 (Commencement No. 11) Order 2008 (S.I. 2008/692)
- S4C (Investment Activities) Approval Order 2008 (S.I. 2008/693)
- Criminal Justice Act 2003 (Commencement No. 19) Order 2008 (S.I. 2008/694)
- Income-related Benefits (Subsidy to Authorities) Amendment (No. 2) Order 2008 (S.I. 2008/695)
- Gas (Standards of Performance) (Amendment) Regulations 2008 (S.I. 2008/696)
- Serious Organised Crime and Police Act 2005 (Commencement No. 12) Order 2008 (S.I. 2008/697)
- Social Security (Miscellaneous Amendments) Regulations 2008 (S.I. 2008/698)
- Social Security (Industrial Injuries) (Dependency) (Permitted Earnings Limits) Order 2008 (S.I. 2008/699)
- Supply of Information (Register of Deaths) (Northern Ireland) Order 2008 (S.I. 2008/700)

== 701–800 ==
- Greater London Authority (Mayor of London Appointments) Order 2008 (S.I. 2008/701)
- Plant Health (Fees) (Forestry) (Amendment) Regulations 2008 (S.I. 2008/702)
- Social Security (Contributions) (Re-rating) Consequential Amendment Regulations 2008 (S.I. 2008/703)
- Individual Savings Account (Amendment) Regulations 2008 (S.I. 2008/704)
- Authorised Investment Funds (Tax) (Amendment) Regulations 2008 (S.I. 2008/705)
- Income Tax (Limits for Enterprise Management Incentives) Order 2008 (S.I. 2008/706)
- Value Added Tax (Increase of Registration Limits) Order 2008 (S.I. 2008/707)
- Capital Gains Tax (Annual Exempt Amount) Order 2008 (S.I. 2008/708)
- Income Tax (Indexation) (No. 2) Order 2008 (S.I. 2008/709)
- Stamp Duty Land Tax (Open-ended Investment Companies) Regulations 2008 (S.I. 2008/710)
- Pensions Increase (Review) Order 2008 (S.I. 2008/711)
- Hywel Dda National Health Service Trust (Establishment) Order 2008 (S.I. 2008/712)
- Meat Products (Wales) (Amendment) Regulations 2008 (S.I. 2008/713)
- Insolvency Proceedings (Fees) (Amendment) Order 2008 (S.I. 2008/714)
- Gender Recognition (Application Fees) (Amendment) Order 2008 (S.I. 2008/715)
- Abertawe Bro Morgannwg University National Health Service Trust (Establishment) Order 2008 (S.I. 2008/716)
- Cwm Taf National Health Service Trust (Establishment) Order 2008 (S.I. 2008/717)
- Northern Rock plc Compensation Scheme Order 2008 (S.I. 2008/718)
- Companies (Reduction of Capital) (Creditor Protection) Regulations 2008 (S.I. 2008/719)
- Registered Pension Schemes (Provision of Information) (Amendment) Regulations 2008 (S.I. 2008/720)
- Workmen's Compensation (Supplementation) (Amendment) Scheme 2008 (S.I. 2008/721)
- Value Added Tax (Consideration for Fuel Provided for Private Use) Order 2008 (S.I. 2008/722)
- Criminal Defence Service (Financial Eligibility) (Amendment) Regulations 2008 (S.I. 2008/723)
- Greater London Authority (Limitation of Salaries) (Amendment) Order 2008 (S.I. 2008/724)
- Criminal Defence Service (General) (No. 2) (Amendment) Regulations 2008 (S.I. 2008/725)
- Social Security Pensions (Low Earnings Threshold) Order 2008 (S.I. 2008/726)
- National Health Service Trusts (Originating Capital) Order 2008 (S.I. 2008/727)
- European Grouping of Territorial Cooperation (Amendment) Regulations 2008 (S.I. 2008/728)
- Companies (Authorised Minimum) Regulations 2008 (S.I. 2008/729)
- Social Security Revaluation of Earnings Factors Order 2008 (S.I. 2008/730)
- Occupational Pension Schemes (Employer Debt and Miscellaneous Amendments) Regulations 2008 (S.I. 2008/731)
- Measuring Instruments (EEC Requirements) (Fees) (Amendment) Regulations 2008 (S.I. 2008/732)
- Financial Services and Markets Act 2000 (Consequential Amendments) Order 2008 (S.I. 2008/733)
- National Savings Bank (Amendment) Regulations 2008 (S.I. 2008/734)
- Abortion (Amendment) Regulations 2008 (S.I. 2008/735)
- Health and Safety (Fees) Regulations 2008 (S.I. 2008/736)
- Insolvency (Amendment) Rules 2008 (S.I. 2008/737)
- Non-automatic Weighing Instruments (Amendment) Regulations 2008 (S.I. 2008/738)
- Companies (Tables A to F) (Amendment) Regulations 2008 (S.I. 2008/739)
- Income Tax (Construction Industry Scheme) (Amendment) Regulations 2008 (S.I. 2008/740)
- Regional Learning and Skills Councils Regulations 2008 (S.I. 2008/741)
- National Assistance (Assessment of Resources and Sums for Personal Requirements) (Amendment) (Wales) Regulations 2008 (S.I. 2008/743)
- Local Authorities (Functions and Responsibilities) (England) (Amendment No. 2) Regulations 2008 (S.I. 2008/744)
- Mental Health Act 2007 (Commencement No. 4) Order 2008 (S.I. 2008/745)
- Derwentside (Parish Electoral Arrangements) Order 2008 (S.I. 2008/746)
- Borough of Berwick-upon-Tweed (Parish Electoral Arrangements and Electoral Changes) Order 2008 (S.I. 2008/747)
- Stratford-on-Avon (Parish Electoral Arrangements and Electoral Changes) Order 2008 (S.I. 2008/748)
- Tribunals, Courts and Enforcement Act 2007 (Commencement No. 3) Order 2008 (S.I. 2008/749)
- East Suffolk Internal Drainage Board Order 2008 (S.I. 2008/750)
- Charities Act 2006 (Commencement No. 3, Transitional Provisions and Savings) Order 2008 (S.I. 2008/751)
- Children Act 2004 (Commencement No. 9) Order 2008 (S.I. 2008/752)
- Hydrocarbon Oil, Biofuels and Other Fuel Substitutes (Determination of Composition of a Substance and Miscellaneous Amendments) Regulations 2008 (S.I. 2008/753)
- Other Fuel Substitutes (Rates of Excise Duty etc.) (Amendment) Order 2008 (S.I. 2008/754)
- Serious Crime Act 2007 (Commencement No. 2 and Transitional and Transitory Provisions and Savings) Order 2008 (S.I. 2008/755)
- Stroud (Parish Electoral Arrangements and Electoral Changes) Order 2008 (S.I. 2008/756)
- Traffic Management Act 2004 (Commencement No. 5 and Transitional Provisions) (England) (Amendment) Order 2008 (S.I. 2008/757)
- Social Security (Jobcentre Plus Interviews for Partners) Amendment Regulations 2008 (S.I. 2008/759)
- Asylum Support (Amendment) Regulations 2008 (S.I. 2008/760)
- Landfill Tax (Amendment) Regulations 2008 (S.I. 2008/770)
- Taxes (Interest Rate) (Amendment) Regulations 2008 (S.I. 2008/778)
- Rice Products from the United States of America (Restriction on First Placing on the Market) (Wales) Regulations 2008 (S.I. 2008/781)
- Income Tax (Pay As You Earn) (Amendment) Regulations 2008 (S.I. 2008/782)
- Designation of Schools Having a Religious Character (Independent Schools) (England) Order 2008 (S.I. 2008/783)
- Childcare Act 2006 (Commencement No. 4) Order 2008 (S.I. 2008/785)
- Immigration (Disposal of Property) Regulations 2008 (S.I. 2008/786)
- Welfare Reform Act 2007 (Commencement No. 6 and Consequential Provisions) Order 2008 (S.I. 2008/787)
- Local Authorities (Model Code of Conduct) (Wales) Order 2008 (S.I. 2008/788)
- Transport of Animals (Cleansing and Disinfection) (Wales) (No. 3) (Amendment) Order 2008 (S.I. 2008/789)
- Police and Justice Act 2006 (Commencement No. 8) Order 2008 (S.I. 2008/790)
- Violent Crime Reduction Act 2006 (Commencement No. 5) Order 2008 (S.I. 2008/791)
- Statistics and Registration Service Act 2007 (Delegation of Functions) (Economic Statistics) Order 2008 (S.I. 2008/792)
- Childcare (Voluntary Registration) (Amendment) Regulations 2008 (S.I. 2008/793)
- Employment and Support Allowance Regulations 2008 (S.I. 2008/794)
- Employment and Support Allowance (Transitional Provisions) Regulations 2008 (S.I. 2008/795)
- Tax Credits Up-rating Regulations 2008 (S.I. 2008/796)
- Child Benefit Up-rating Order 2008 (S.I. 2008/797)
- Guardian's Allowance Up-rating Order 2008 (S.I. 2008/798)
- Guardian's Allowance Up-rating (Northern Ireland) Order 2008 (S.I. 2008/799)
- Mental Health Act 2007 (Commencement No. 5 and Transitional Provisions) Order 2008 (S.I. 2008/800)

== 801–900 ==
- Bede Sixth Form College, Billingham (Dissolution) Order 2008 (S.I. 2008/812)
- Government Resources and Accounts Act 2000 (Audit of Public Bodies) Order 2008 (S.I. 2008/817)
- Consumer Credit Act 2006 (Commencement No. 4 and Transitional Provisions) Order 2008 (S.I. 2008/831)
- Income Tax (Professional Fees) Order 2008 (S.I. 2008/836)
- Income Tax (Payments on Account) (Amendment) Regulations 2008 (S.I. 2008/838)
- Statistics and Registration Service Act 2007 (Commencement No. 2 and Transitional Provision) Order 2008 (S.I. 2008/839)
- Guardian's Allowance Up-rating Regulations 2008 (S.I. 2008/840)
- Grants to the Churches Conservation Trust Order 2008 (S.I. 2008/842)
- National Health Service (Travel Expenses and Remission of Charges) Amendment Regulations 2008 (S.I. 2008/843)
- Trustees for the St Mary's National Health Service Trust (Transfer of Trust Property) Order 2008 (S.I. 2008/894)
- Trustees for the Hammersmith Hospitals National Health Service Trust (Transfer of Trust Property) Order 2008 (S.I. 2008/895)
- Housing Act 2004 (Commencement No. 11) (England and Wales) Order 2008 (S.I. 2008/898)

== 901–1000 ==
- Consumers, Estate Agents and Redress Act 2007 (Commencement No. 4) Order 2008 (S.I. 2008/905)
- National Health Service Pension Scheme (Correction to Amendment) Regulations 2008 (S.I. 2008/906)
- Bedfordshire (Structural Changes) Order 2008 (S.I. 2008/907)
- Department for Transport (Driver Licensing and Vehicle Registration Fees) (Amendment) Order 2008 (S.I. 2008/908)
- Pension Protection Fund (Pension Compensation Cap) Order 2008 (S.I. 2008/909)
- Occupational Pension Schemes (Levies) (Amendment) Regulations 2008 (S.I. 2008/910)
- Occupational Pension Schemes (Levy Ceiling) Order 2008 (S.I. 2008/911)
- Offender Management Act 2007 (Consequential Amendments) Order 2008 (S.I. 2008/912)
- Civil Enforcement of Parking Contraventions (Penalty Charge Notices, Enforcement and Adjudication) (Wales) (Amendment) Regulations 2008 (S.I. 2008/913)
- Stamp Duty Reserve Tax (virt-x Exchange Limited) (Amendment) Regulations 2008 (S.I. 2008/914)
- Local Involvement Networks (Duty of Services-Providers to Allow Entry) Regulations 2008 (S.I. 2008/915)
- Plastic Materials and Articles in Contact with Food (England) Regulations 2008 (S.I. 2008/916)
- Local Government and Public Involvement in Health Act 2007 (Commencement No. 5 and Transitional, Saving and Transitory Provision) Order 2008 (S.I. 2008/917)
- Tate Gallery Board (Additional Members) Order 2008 (S.I. 2008/919)
- Crown Agents Holding and Realisation Board (Prescribed Day) Order 2008 (S.I. 2008/921)
- North Glamorgan National Health Service Trust (Transfer of Staff, Property, Rights and Liabilities) Order 2008 (S.I. 2008/922)
- Education (QCA Levy) (Revocation) Regulations 2008 (S.I. 2008/923)
- Pontypridd and Rhondda National Health Service Trust (Transfer of Staff, Property, Rights and Liabilities) Order 2008 (S.I. 2008/924)
- Rail Vehicle Accessibility (B2007 Vehicles) Exemption Order 2008 (S.I. 2008/925)
- Swansea National Health Service Trust (Transfer of staff, Property, Rights and Liabilities) Order 2008 (S.I. 2008/926)
- Bro Morgannwg National Health Service Trust (Transfer of Staff, Property, Rights and Liabilities) Order 2008 (S.I. 2008/927)
- Official Statistics Order 2008 (S.I. 2008/928)
- Relevant Authorities (Code of Conduct) (Prescribed Period for Undertakings) (Wales) Order 2008 (S.I. 2008/929)
- Safeguarding Vulnerable Groups Act 2006 (Commencement No. 1) (Northern Ireland) Order 2008 (S.I. 2008/930)
- Carmarthenshire National Health Service Trust (Transfer of Staff, Property, Rights and Liabilities) Order 2008 (S.I. 2008/931)
- Pontypridd and Rhondda National Health Service Trust (Dissolution) Order 2008 (S.I. 2008/932)
- Carmarthenshire National Health Service Trust (Dissolution) Order 2008 (S.I. 2008/933)
- Ceredigion and Mid Wales National Health Service Trust (Dissolution) Order 2008 (S.I. 2008/934)
- Ceredigion and Mid Wales National Health Service Trust (Transfer of Staff, Property, Rights and Liabilities) Order 2008 (S.I. 2008/935)
- Pembrokeshire and Derwen National Health Service Trust (Transfer of Staff, Property, Rights and Liabilities) Order 2008 (S.I. 2008/936)
- Pembrokeshire and Derwen National Health Service Trust (Dissolution) Order 2008 (S.I. 2008/937)
- Swansea National Health Service Trust (Dissolution) Order 2008 (S.I. 2008/938)
- Bro Morgannwg National Health Service Trust (Dissolution) Order 2008 (S.I. 2008/939)
- North Glamorgan National Health Service Trust (Dissolution) Order 2008 (S.I. 2008/940)
- Medicines for Human Use (Clinical Trials) and Blood Safety and Quality (Amendment) Regulations 2008 (S.I. 2008/941)
- Specified Animal Pathogens Order 2008 (S.I. 2008/944)
- Charities Act 2006 (Commencement No. 4, Transitional Provisions and Savings) Order 2008 (S.I. 2008/945)
- Proceeds of Crime Act 2002 (Investigations in England, Wales and Northern Ireland: Code of Practice) Order 2008 (S.I. 2008/946)
- Proceeds of Crime Act 2002 (Cash Searches: Code of Practice) Order 2008 (S.I. 2008/947)
- Companies Act 2006 (Consequential Amendments etc.) Order 2008 (S.I. 2008/948)
- Serious Crime Act 2007 (Amendment of the Proceeds of Crime Act 2002) Order 2008 (S.I. 2008/949)
- Protection of Military Remains Act 1986 (Designation of Vessels and Controlled Sites) Order 2008 (S.I. 2008/950)
- Borough of Tewkesbury (Parish Electoral Arrangements) Order 2008 (S.I. 2008/951)
- Companies Act 2006 (Consequential Amendments) (Taxes and National Insurance) Order 2008 (S.I. 2008/954)
- Clean Neighbourhoods and Environment Act 2005 (Commencement No. 5) Order 2008 (S.I. 2008/956)
- Criminal Defence Service (Funding) (Amendment) Order 2008 (S.I. 2008/957)
- Town and Country Planning (Fees for Applications and Deemed Applications) (Amendment) (England) Regulations 2008 (S.I. 2008/958)
- Housing Benefit and Council Tax Benefit (Extended Payments) Amendment Regulations 2008 (S.I. 2008/959)
- Legislative Reform (Health and Safety Executive) Order 2008 (S.I. 2008/960)
- Childcare (Supply and Disclosure of Information) (England) (Amendment) Regulations 2008 (S.I. 2008/961)
- Bluetongue Regulations 2008 (S.I. 2008/962)
- Sex Discrimination (Amendment of Legislation) Regulations 2008 (S.I. 2008/963)
- River Humber (Upper Burcom Tidal Stream Generator) Order 2008 (S.I. 2008/969)
- Blood Tests (Evidence of Paternity) (Amendment) Regulations 2008 (S.I. 2008/972)
- Criminal Justice Act 1988 (Offensive Weapons) (Amendment) Order 2008 (S.I. 2008/973)
- Childcare (Early Years Register) Regulations 2008 (S.I. 2008/974)
- Childcare (General Childcare Register) Regulations 2008 (S.I. 2008/975)
- Childcare (Early Years and General Childcare Registers) (Common Provisions) Regulations 2008 (S.I. 2008/976)
- Early Removal of Short-Term and Long-Term Prisoners (Amendment of Requisite Period) Order 2008 (S.I. 2008/977)
- Early Removal of Fixed-Term Prisoners (Amendment of Eligibility Period) Order 2008 (S.I. 2008/978)
- Childcare (Exemptions from Registration) Order 2008 (S.I. 2008/979)
- Ellesmere Port and Neston (Parish) (Amendment) Order 2008 (S.I. 2008/980)
- Local Government Finance (England) (Substitution of Penalties) Order 2008 (S.I. 2008/981)
- Further Education and Training Act 2007 (Commencement No. 2) (Wales) Order 2008 (S.I. 2008/983)
- Sea Fishing (Enforcement of Community Measures) (Penalty Notices) Order 2008 (S.I. 2008/984)

== 1001–1100 ==
- Transfer of Functions (Miscellaneous) Order 2008 (S.I. 2008/1034)
- Scotland Act 1998 (Agency Arrangements) (Specification) Order 2008 (S.I. 2008/1035)
- National Assembly for Wales (Legislative Competence) (Education and Training) Order 2008 (S.I. 2008/1036)
- Medical Act 1983 (Qualifying Examinations) Order 2008 (S.I. 2008/1037)
- Motor Vehicles (Driving Licences) (Amendment No. 2) Regulations 2008 (S.I. 2008/1038)
- Bovine Semen (Wales) Regulations 2008 (S.I. 2008/1040)
- Social Security (Miscellaneous Amendments) (No.2) Regulations 2008 (S.I. 2008/1042)
- Occupational Pension Schemes (Transfer Values) (Amendment) Regulations 2008 (S.I. 2008/1050)
- Civil Enforcement of Parking Contraventions (County of Devon) Designation Order 2008 (S.I. 2008/1051)
- Magistrates’ Courts Fees Order 2008 (S.I. 2008/1052)
- Civil Proceedings Fees Order 2008 (S.I. 2008/1053)
- Family Proceedings Fees Order 2008 (S.I. 2008/1054)
- Civil Enforcement of Parking Contraventions (County of Cornwall) Designation Order 2008 (S.I. 2008/1055)
- Safeguarding Vulnerable Groups Act 2006 (Prescribed Criteria) (Transitional Provisions) Regulations 2008 (S.I. 2008/1062)
- Seed Potatoes (Wales) (Amendment) Regulations 2008 (S.I. 2008/1063)
- Zootechnical Standards (Amendment) (Wales) Regulations 2008 (S.I. 2008/1064)
- Further Education and Training Act 2007 (Commencement No. 1) (England and Wales) Order 2008 (S.I. 2008/1065)
- Disease Control (England) (Amendment) Order 2008 (S.I. 2008/1066)
- Trade Marks (Earlier Trade Marks) Regulations 2008 (S.I. 2008/1067)
- Occupational Pension Schemes (Employer Debt – Apportionment Arrangements) (Amendment) Regulations 2008 (S.I. 2008/1068)
- Specified Products from China (Restriction on First Placing on the Market) (England) Regulations 2008 (S.I. 2008/1079)
- Specified Products from China (Restriction on First Placing on the Market) (Wales) Regulations 2008 (S.I. 2008/1080)
- Heather and Grass etc. Burning (Wales) Regulations 2008 (S.I. 2008/1081)
- Employment and Support Allowance (Consequential Provisions) Regulations 2008 (S.I. 2008/1082)
- Local Government Pension Scheme (Amendment) Regulations 2008 (S.I. 2008/1083)
- Civil Enforcement of Parking Contraventions (County of Cheshire) (Borough of Macclesfield) Designation Order 2008 (S.I. 2008/1084)
- Standards Committee (England) Regulations 2008 (S.I. 2008/1085)
- Civil Enforcement of Parking Contraventions (County of Nottinghamshire) Designation Order 2008 (S.I. 2008/1086)
- Control of Major Accident Hazard (Amendment) Regulations 2008 (S.I. 2008/1087)
- Asylum and Immigration Tribunal (Procedure) (Amendment) Rules 2008 (S.I. 2008/1088)
- Asylum and Immigration Tribunal (Fast Track Procedure) (Amendment) Rules 2008 (S.I. 2008/1089)
- Bluetongue (Wales) Regulations 2008 (S.I. 2008/1090)
- Bathing Water Regulations 2008 (S.I. 2008/1097)
- Export Control (Burma) Order 2008 (S.I. 2008/1098)

== 1101–1200 ==
- Common Agricultural Policy Single Payment and Support Schemes (Amendment) Regulations 2008 (S.I. 2008/1139)
- Friendly Societies Act 1992 (Accounts, Audit and EEA State Amendments) Order 2008 (S.I. 2008/1140)
- National Savings Bank (Amendment) (No. 2) Regulations 2008 (S.I. 2008/1142)
- Friendly Societies Act 1992 (Accounts, Audit and EEA State Amendments) Order 2008 (S.I. 2008/1143)
- Friendly Societies (Accounts and Related Provisions) (Amendment) Regulations 2008 (S.I. 2008/1144)
- Value Added Tax (Buildings and Land) Order 2008 (S.I. 2008/1146)
- Health Act 2006 (Commencement No. 4) Order 2008 (S.I. 2008/1147)
- National Health Service Delegation of Functions to the NHS Business Services Authority (Awdurdod Gwasanaethau Busnes y GIG) (Counter Fraud and Security Management) Regulations 2008 (S.I. 2008/1148)
- Membership of the Tribunal Procedure Committee Transitional Order 2008 (S.I. 2008/1149)
- Tribunals, Courts and Enforcement Act 2007 (Commencement No. 4) Order 2008 (S.I. 2008/1158)
- Protection of Cultural Objects on Loan (Publication and Provision of Information) Regulations 2008 (S.I. 2008/1159)
- Teesport Harbour Revision Order 2008 (S.I. 2008/1160)
- Medicines for Human Use (Prescribing) (Miscellaneous Amendments) Order 2008 (S.I. 2008/1161)
- Medicines (Sale or Supply) (Miscellaneous Amendments) Regulations 2008 (S.I. 2008/1162)
- Electricity and Gas (Billing) Regulations 2008 (S.I. 2008/1163)
- National Savings Bank (Amendment) (No. 3) Regulations 2008 (S.I. 2008/1164)
- Football Spectators (2008 European Championship Control Period) Order 2008 (S.I. 2008/1165)
- Lyon Court and Office Fees (Variation) Order 2008 (S.I. 2008/1166)
- Discretionary Housing Payments (Grants) Amendment Order 2008 (S.I. 2008/1167)
- Transmissible Spongiform Encephalopathies (No. 2) (Amendment) Regulations 2008 (S.I. 2008/1180)
- Commission for Healthcare Audit and Inspection (Defence Medical Services) Regulations 2008 (S.I. 2008/1181)
- Transmissible Spongiform Encephalopathies (Wales) (Amendment) Regulations 2008 (S.I. 2008/1182)
- Immigration (Biometric Registration) (Pilot) Regulations 2008 (S.I. 2008/1183)
- Mental Health (Hospital, Guardianship and Treatment) (England) Regulations 2008 (S.I. 2008/1184)
- General Ophthalmic Services Contracts Regulations 2008 (S.I. 2008/1185)
- Primary Ophthalmic Services Regulations 2008 (S.I. 2008/1186)
- National Health Service (Performers Lists) Amendment and Transitional Provisions Regulations 2008 (S.I. 2008/1187)
- Food Labelling (Declaration of Allergens) (England) Regulations 2008 (S.I. 2008/1188)
- Disabled Facilities Grants (Maximum Amounts and Additional Purposes) (England) Order 2008 (S.I. 2008/1189)
- Housing Renewal Grants (Amendment) (England) Regulations 2008 (S.I. 2008/1190)

== 1201–1300 ==
- Reciprocal Enforcement of Maintenance Orders (Designation of Reciprocating Countries) Order 2008 (S.I. 2008/1202)
- Maintenance Orders (Facilities for Enforcement) (Revocation) Order 2008 (S.I. 2008/1203)
- Mental Health (Mutual Recognition) Regulations 2008 (S.I. 2008/1204)
- Mental Health (Conflicts of Interest) (England) Regulations 2008 (S.I. 2008/1205)
- Mental Health (Approved Mental Health Professionals) (Approval) (England) Regulations 2008 (S.I. 2008/1206)
- Mental Health (Nurses) (England) Order 2008 (S.I. 2008/1207)
- Defence Aviation Repair Agency Trading Fund (Revocation) Order 2008 (S.I. 2008/1208)
- Primary Ophthalmic Services Transitional Provisions Regulations 2008 (S.I. 2008/1209)
- Mental Health Act 2007 (Commencement No. 6 and After-care under Supervision: Savings, Modifications and Transitional Provisions) Order 2008 (S.I. 2008/1210)
- Civil Enforcement of Parking Contraventions (County of Rutland) Designation Order 2008 (S.I. 2008/1211)
- Civil Enforcement of Parking Contraventions (County of Gloucestershire) (Forest of Dean District) Designation Order 2008 (S.I. 2008/1212)
- Street Works (Inspection Fees) (Wales) (Amendment) (No. 2) Regulations 2008 1213)
- Civil Enforcement of Parking Contraventions (General Provisions) (Wales) (No. 2) Regulations 2008 (S.I. 2008/1214)
- Civil Enforcement of Parking Contraventions (Approved Devices) (Wales) (No. 2) Order 2008 (S.I. 2008/1215)
- Criminal Justice (Northern Ireland) Order 2008 (S.I. 2008/1216)
- Plastic Materials and Articles in Contact with Food (Wales) Regulations 2008 (S.I. 2008/1237)
- Teesport (Land Acquisition) Order 2008 (S.I. 2008/1238)
- Air Navigation (Restriction of Flying) (Scottish Highlands) Regulations 2008 (S.I. 2008/1239)
- British Overseas Territories Citizenship (Designated Service) (Amendment) Order 2008 (S.I. 2008/1240)
- Criminal Justice (Northern Ireland Consequential Amendments) Order 2008 (S.I. 2008/1241)
- Northern Ireland Act 1998 (Modification) Order 2008 (S.I. 2008/1242)
- Merchant Shipping (Categorisation of Registries of Relevant British Possessions) (Amendment) Order 2008 (S.I. 2008/1243)
- General Medical Council (Fitness to Practise) (Amendment in Relation to Standard of Proof) Rules Order of Council 2008 (S.I. 2008/1256)
- School Admissions (Alteration and Variation of, and Objections to, Arrangements) (England) (Amendment) Regulations 2008 (S.I. 2008/1258)
- Education (Fees and Awards) (Wales) Regulations 2008 (S.I. 2008/1259)
- London Gateway Port Harbour Empowerment Order 2008 (S.I. 2008/1261)
- Consumers, Estate Agents and Redress Act 2007 (Commencement No. 3 and Supplementary Provision) Order 2008 (S.I. 2008/1262)
- Offender Management Act 2007 (Approved Premises) Regulations 2008 (S.I. 2008/1263)
- Local Government and Public Involvement in Health Act 2007 (Commencement No. 6 and Transitional and Saving Provision) Order 2008 (S.I. 2008/1265)
- Home Information Pack (Amendment) (No. 2) Regulations 2008 (S.I. 2008/1266)
- Measuring Instruments (EC Requirements) (Amendment) Regulations 2008 (S.I. 2008/1267)
- Food Labelling (Declaration of Allergens) (Wales) Regulations 2008 (S.I. 2008/1268)
- Primary Care Trusts and National Health Service Trusts (Membership and Procedure) Amendment Regulations 2008 (S.I. 2008/1269)
- Specified Animal Pathogens (Wales) Order 2008 (S.I. 2008/1270)
- Freedom of Information (Additional Public Authorities) Order 2008 (S.I. 2008/1271)
- Financial Assistance For Industry (Increase of Limit) Order 2008 (S.I. 2008/1272)
- Assembly Learning Grants and Loans (Higher Education) (Wales) Regulations 2008 (S.I. 2008/1273)
- Products of Animal Origin (Disease Control) (Wales) Regulations 2008 (S.I. 2008/1275)
- Business Protection from Misleading Marketing Regulations 2008 (SI 2008/1276)
- Consumer Protection from Unfair Trading Regulations 2008 (SI 2008/1277)
- Export of Goods, Transfer of Technology and Provision of Technical Assistance (Control) (Amendment) Order 2008 (S.I. 2008/1281)
- Income Tax (Construction Industry Scheme) (Amendment No. 2) Regulations 2008 (S.I. 2008/1282)
- Cosmetic Products (Safety) Regulations 2008 (S.I. 2008/1284)
- Recreation Grounds (Revocation of Parish Council Byelaws) Order 2008 (S.I. 2008/1285)
- Regional Transport Planning (Wales) (Amendment) Order 2008 (S.I. 2008/1286)
- Spreadable Fats (Marketing Standards) and the Milk and Milk Products (Protection of Designations) (England) Regulations 2008 (S.I. 2008/1287)

== 1301–1400 ==
- Motor Vehicles (Driving Licences) (Amendment No. 3) Regulations 2008 (S.I. 2008/1312)
- Disease Control (Wales) (Amendment) Order 2008 1314)
- Mental Capacity (Deprivation of Liberty: Appointment of Relevant Person's Representative) Regulations 2008 (S.I. 2008/1315)
- Electoral Administration Act 2006 (Commencement No. 7) Order 2008 (S.I. 2008/1316)
- Drinking Milk (England) Regulations 2008 (S.I. 2008/1317)
- Northern Ireland (Miscellaneous Provisions) Act 2006 (Commencement No. 4) Order 2008 (S.I. 2008/1318)
- Electoral Administration Act 2006 (Regulation of Loans etc.: Northern Ireland) Order 2008 (S.I. 2008/1319)
- Safeguarding Vulnerable Groups Act 2006 (Commencement No. 2) Order 2008 (S.I. 2008/1320)
- Shrewsbury and Atcham (Parish) Order 2008 (S.I. 2008/1321)
- Fisheries and Aquaculture Structures (Grants) (England) (Amendment) Regulations 2008 (S.I. 2008/1322)
- Cambridgeshire and Peterborough Mental Health Partnership National Health Service Trust (Transfer of Trust Property) Order 2008 (S.I. 2008/1323)
- Assembly Learning Grants (European Institutions) (Wales) (Amendment) Regulations 2008 (S.I. 2008/1324)
- Serious Organised Crime and Police Act 2005 (Commencement No. 13) Order 2008 (S.I. 2008/1325)
- Gambling Act 2005 (Commencement No. 8) Order 2008 (S.I. 2008/1326)
- Gambling (Geographical Distribution of Large and Small Casino Premises Licences) Order 2008 (S.I. 2008/1327)
- Community Legal Service (Funding) (Amendment) Order 2008 (S.I. 2008/1328)
- National Health Service (General Medical Services Contracts) (Wales) (Amendment) Regulations 2008 (S.I. 2008/1329)
- Categories of Casino Regulations 2008 (S.I. 2008/1330)
- Architects (Recognition of European Qualifications etc. and Saving and Transitional Provision) Regulations 2008 (S.I. 2008/1331)
- Road Traffic Offenders (Prescribed Devices) Order 2008 (S.I. 2008/1332)
- Health and Social Care (Community Health and Standards) Act 2003 (Commencement No. 12) Order 2008 (S.I. 2008/1334)
- Disability Discrimination Code of Practice (Trade Organisations, Qualifications Bodies and General Qualifications Bodies) (Commencement) Order 2008 (S.I. 2008/1335)
- Disability Discrimination Code of Practice (Trade Organisations and Qualifications Bodies) (Revocation) Order 2008 (S.I. 2008/1336)
- Immigration and Nationality (Cost Recovery Fees) (Amendment No. 2) Regulations 2008 (S.I. 2008/1337)
- Abortion (Amendment) (Wales) Regulations 2008 (S.I. 2008/1338)
- Value Added Tax (Refund of Tax to Museums and Galleries) (Amendment) Order 2008 (S.I. 2008/1339)
- Civil Enforcement of Parking Contraventions (County of Wiltshire) (District of West Wiltshire) Designation Order 2008 (S.I. 2008/1340)
- Spreadable Fats (Marketing Standards) and the Milk and Milk Products (Protection of Designations) (Wales) Regulations 2008 (S.I. 2008/1341)
- European Regional Development Fund (London Operational Programme) (Implementation) Regulations 2008 (S.I. 2008/1342)
- Cash Ratio Deposits (Value Bands and Ratios) Order 2008 (S.I. 2008/1344)
- Fire and Rescue Services (National Framework) (England) Order 2008 (S.I. 2008/1370)
- Town and Country Planning (Local Development) (England) (Amendment) Regulations 2008 (S.I. 2008/1371)
- Greater London Authority Act 2007 (Commencement No.4 and Saving) Order 2008 (S.I. 2008/1372)
- Kingston upon Hull City Council (Scale Lane Bridge) Scheme 2008 Confirmation Instrument 2008 (S.I. 2008/1373)

== 1401–1500 ==
- Motor Vehicles (Tests) (Amendment) Regulations 2008 (S.I. 2008/1402)
- Technology Strategy Board (Transfer of Property etc.) Order 2008 (S.I. 2008/1405)
- Crime and Disorder (Prescribed Information) (Amendment) Regulations 2008 (S.I. 2008/1406)
- Violent Crime Reduction Act 2006 (Commencement No. 6) Order 2008 (S.I. 2008/1407)
- Education (National Curriculum) (Modern Foreign Languages) (Wales) Order 2008 (S.I. 2008/1408)
- Education (National Curriculum) (Attainment Targets and Programmes of Study) (Wales) Order 2008 (S.I. 2008/1409)
- Value Added Tax (Reduced Rate) (Smoking Cessation Products) Order 2008 (S.I. 2008/1410)
- Manchester College of Arts and Technology and City College, Manchester (Dissolution) Order 2008 (S.I. 2008/1418)
- Local Government (Structural and Boundary Changes) (Staffing) Regulations 2008 (S.I. 2008/1419)
- Television Multiplex Services (Reservation of Digital Capacity) Order 2008 (S.I. 2008/1420)
- Multiplex Licence (Broadcasting of Programmes in Gaelic) Order 2008 (S.I. 2008/1421)
- Reconstitution of the Welland and Deepings Internal Drainage Board Order 2008 (S.I. 2008/1422)
- Reconstitution of the Black Sluice Internal Drainage Board Order 2008 (S.I. 2008/1423)
- Criminal Justice Act 2003 (Commencement No. 21) Order 2008 (S.I. 2008/1424)
- National Health Service (Primary Medical Services) and (Performers Lists) (Miscellaneous Amendments) (Wales) Regulations 2008 (S.I. 2008/1425)
- Mutilations (Permitted Procedures) (England) (Amendment) Regulations 2008 (S.I. 2008/1426)
- Building Societies (Financial Assistance) Order 2008 (S.I. 2008/1427)
- Reporting of Prices of Milk Products (England) Regulations 2008 (S.I. 2008/1428)
- Education and Inspections Act 2006 (Commencement No. 1 and Saving Provisions) (Wales) Order 2008 (S.I. 2008/1429)
- Local Authorities (Alcohol Disorder Zones) Regulations 2008 (S.I. 2008/1430)
- Social Security (Contributions) (Amendment No. 4) Regulations 2008 (S.I. 2008/1431)
- Financial Assistance Scheme (Miscellaneous Provisions) Regulations 2008 (S.I. 2008/1432)
- Design Right (Semiconductor Topographies) (Amendment) (No. 2) Regulations 2008 (S.I. 2008/1434)
- Motor Vehicles (Driving Licences) (Amendment) (No. 4) Regulations 2008 (S.I. 2008/1435)
- Legal Services Act 2007 (Commencement No. 2 and Transitory Provisions) Order 2008 (S.I. 2008/1436)
- Local Authority Targets (Well-Being of Young Children) (Amendment) Regulations 2008 (S.I. 2008/1437)
- Tope (Prohibition of Fishing) (Wales) Order 2008 (S.I. 2008/1438)
- Financial Services and Markets Act 2000 (Market Abuse) Regulations 2008 (S.I. 2008/1439)
- Whole of Government Accounts (Designation of Bodies) Order 2008 (S.I. 2008/1440)
- Compensation (Claims Management Services) (Amendment) Regulations 2008 (S.I. 2008/1441)
- Motor Vehicles (Approval) (Fees) (Amendment) Regulations 2008 (S.I. 2008/1443)
- Road Vehicles (Registration and Licensing) (Amendment) (No. 2) Regulations 2008 (S.I. 2008/1444)
- Public Service Vehicles (Conditions of Fitness, Equipment, Use and Certification) (Amendment) Regulations 2008 (S.I. 2008/1458)
- Public Service Vehicles Accessibility (Amendment) Regulations 2008 (S.I. 2008/1459)
- Goods Vehicles (Plating and Testing) (Amendment) Regulations 2008 (S.I. 2008/1460)
- Motor Vehicles (Tests) (Amendment) (No. 2) Regulations 2008 (S.I. 2008/1461)
- Motor Cycles Etc. (Single Vehicle Approval) (Fees) (Amendment) Regulations 2008 (S.I. 2008/1462)
- Authorised Investment Funds (Tax) (Amendment No. 2) Regulations 2008 (S.I. 2008/1463)
- Taxation of Benefits under Government Pilot Schemes (Up-Front Childcare Fund) Order 2008 (S.I. 2008/1464)
- Community Bus (Amendment) Regulations 2008 (S.I. 2008/1465)
- Criminal Justice and Immigration Act 2008 (Commencement No. 1 and Transitional Provisions) Order 2008 (S.I. 2008/1466)
- Financial Services and Markets Act 2000 (Control of Business Transfers)(Requirements on Applicants)(Amendment) Regulations 2008 (S.I. 2008/1467)
- Financial Services and Markets Act 2000 (Amendments to Part 7) Regulations 2008 (S.I. 2008/1468)
- Financial Services and Markets Act 2000 (Amendment of section 323) Regulations 2008 (S.I. 2008/1469)
- Public Service Vehicles (Registration of Local Services) (Amendment) (England and Wales) Regulations 2008 (S.I. 2008/1470)
- Cardiothoracic Centre–Liverpool National Health Service Trust (Change of Name) (Establishment) Amendment Order 2008 (S.I. 2008/1471)
- Dee Estuary Cockle Fishery Order 2008 (S.I. 2008/1472)
- Public Service Vehicles (Operators’ Licences) (Fees) (Amendment) Regulations 2008 (S.I. 2008/1473)
- Goods Vehicles (Licensing of Operators) (Fees) (Amendment) Regulations 2008 (S.I. 2008/1474)
- Child Maintenance and Other Payments Act 2008 (Commencement) Order 2008 (S.I. 2008/1476)
- Education (Mandatory Awards) (Amendment) Regulations 2008 (S.I. 2008/1477)
- Education (Student Support) (European Institutions) (Amendment) Regulations 2008 (S.I. 2008/1478)
- Education (Student Loans) (Amendment) (England and Wales) Regulations 2008 (S.I. 2008/1479)
- National Health Service (Travelling Expenses and Remission of Charges) (Wales) (Amendment) Regulations 2008 (S.I. 2008/1480)
- Income Tax (Purchased Life Annuities) (Amendment) Regulations 2008 (S.I. 2008/1481)
- Value Added Tax, etc. (Correction of Errors, etc.) Regulations 2008 (S.I. 2008/1482)
- Inspectors of Education, Children's Services and Skills (No. 2) Order 2008 (S.I. 2008/1484)
- Nursing and Midwifery (Amendment) Order 2008 (S.I. 2008/1485)
- Parliamentary Constituencies (Northern Ireland) Order 2008 (S.I. 2008/1486)
- Air Navigation (Isle of Man) (Amendment) Order 2008 (S.I. 2008/1487)
- Naval Medical Compassionate Fund (Amendment) Order 2008 (S.I. 2008/1488)
- Protection of Children and Vulnerable Adults and Care Standards Tribunal (Children's and Adults’ Barred Lists) (Transitional Provisions) Regulations 2008 (S.I. 2008/1497)

== 1501–1600 ==
- Commissioner for Older People in Wales (Amendment) Regulations 2008 (S.I. 2008/1512)
- Civil Enforcement of Parking Contraventions (England) General (Amendment) Regulations 2008 (S.I. 2008/1513)
- Local Involvement Networks (Miscellaneous Amendments) Regulations 2008 (S.I. 2008/1514)
- Civil Enforcement of Parking Contraventions (The Borough Council of Dudley) Designation Order 2008 (S.I. 2008/1518)
- Building Societies Act 1986 (Accounts, Audit and EEA State Amendments) Order 2008 (S.I. 2008/1519)
- Energy-Saving Items (Corporation Tax) Regulations 2008 (S.I. 2008/1520)
- Finance Act 2007, Section 17(2) (Corporation Tax Deduction for Expenditure on Energy-Saving Items) (Appointed Day) Order 2008 (S.I. 2008/1521)
- Offshore Installations (Safety Zones) Order 2008 (S.I. 2008/1522)
- Feeding Stuffs (England) (Amendment) Regulations 2008 (S.I. 2008/1523)
- Social Security (Industrial Injuries) (Prescribed Diseases) Amendment (No. 2) Regulations 2008 (S.I. 2008/1552)
- Royal Pharmaceutical Society of Great Britain (Registration Amendment Rules) Order of Council 2008 (S.I. 2008/1553)
- Employment and Support Allowance (Consequential Provisions) (No. 2) Regulations 2008 (S.I. 2008/1554)
- Town and Country Planning (Environmental Impact Assessment) (Mineral Permissions and Amendment) (England) Regulations 2008 (S.I. 2008/1556)
- West Northamptonshire Joint Committee Order 2008 (S.I. 2008/1572)
- Education (Outturn Statements) (England) Regulations 2008 (S.I. 2008/1575)
- Goods Vehicles (Authorisation of International Journeys) (Fees) (Amendment) Regulations 2008 (S.I. 2008/1576)
- Road Transport (International Passenger Services) (Amendment) Regulations 2008 (S.I. 2008/1577)
- International Carriage of Dangerous Goods by Road (Fees) (Amendment) Regulations 2008 (S.I. 2008/1578)
- Corporation Tax (Implementation of the Mergers Directive) Regulations 2008 (S.I. 2008/1579)
- International Transport of Goods under Cover of TIR Carnets (Fees) (Amendment) Regulations 2008 (S.I. 2008/1580)
- Passenger and Goods Vehicles (Recording Equipment) (Approval of Fitters and Workshops) (Fees) (Amendment) Regulations 2008 (S.I. 2008/1581)
- Education (Student Support) (No.2) Regulations 2008 (S.I. 2008/1582)
- Bluetongue (Wales) (Amendment) Regulations 2008 (S.I. 2008/1583)
- Lyme Bay Designated Area (Fishing Restrictions) Order 2008 (S.I. 2008/1584)
- Air Force Act 1955 (Part 1) (Amendment) Regulations 2008 (S.I. 2008/1585)
- Criminal Justice and Immigration Act 2008 (Commencement No. 2 and Transitional and Saving Provisions) Order 2008 (S.I. 2008/1586)
- Criminal Justice and Immigration Act 2008 (Transitory Provisions) Order 2008 (S.I. 2008/1587)
- Taxation of Chargeable Gains (Gilt-edged Securities) Order 2008 (S.I. 2008/1588)
- Extradition Act 2003 (Amendment to Designations) Order 2008 (S.I. 2008/1589)
- Planning (National Security Directions and Appointed Representatives) (Scotland) Rules 2008 (S.I. 2008/1590)
- Legal Services Act 2007 (Commencement No. 2 and Transitory Provisions) (Amendment) Order 2008 (S.I. 2008/1591)
- Data Protection Act 1998 (Commencement No. 2) Order 2008 (S.I. 2008/1592)
- Education (Assisted Places) (Amendment) (England) Regulations 2008 (S.I. 2008/1593)
- Education (Assisted Places) (Incidental Expenses) (Amendment) (England) Regulations 2008 (S.I. 2008/1594)
- Mesothelioma Lump Sum Payments (Claims and Reconsiderations) Regulations 2008 (S.I. 2008/1595)
- Social Security (Recovery of Benefits) (Lump Sum Payments) Regulations 2008 (S.I. 2008/1596)
- Supply of Machinery (Safety) Regulations 2008 (S.I. 2008/1597)
- Home Loss Payments (Prescribed Amounts) (England) Regulations 2008 (S.I. 2008/1598)
- Social Security (Students and Miscellaneous Amendments) Regulations 2008 (S.I. 2008/1599)

== 1601–1700 ==
- Industrial Training Levy (Reasonable Steps) Regulations 2008 (S.I. 2008/1639)
- Student Fees (Qualifying Courses and Persons) (England) (Amendment) Regulations 2008 (S.I. 2008/1640)
- Financial Services and Markets Act 2000 (Collective Investment Schemes) (Amendment) Order 2008 (S.I. 2008/1641)
- Plastic Materials and Articles in Contact with Food (England) (Amendment) Regulations 2008 (S.I. 2008/1642)
- Education (Designated Institutions) (Amendment) (England) Order 2008 (S.I. 2008/1643)
- Safety of Sports Grounds (Designation) (No. 2) Order 2008 (S.I. 2008/1644)
- Terrorism Act 2000 (Proscribed Organisations) (Amendment) Order 2008 (S.I. 2008/1645)
- Rice Products from the United States of America (Restriction on First Placing on the Market) (Wales) (Amendment) Regulations 2008 (S.I. 2008/1646)
- European Parliament (House of Lords Disqualification) Regulations 2008 (S.I. 2008/1647)
- North Wales National Health Service Trust (Establishment) Order 2008 (S.I. 2008/1648)
- Income-related Benefits (Subsidy to Authorities) Amendment (No. 3) Order 2008 (S.I. 2008/1649)
- Armed Forces Act 2006 (Commencement No. 3) Order 2008 (S.I. 2008/1650)
- Armed Forces (Service Inquiries) Regulations 2008 (S.I. 2008/1651)
- Coroners (Amendment) Rules 2008 (S.I. 2008/1652)
- Tribunals, Courts and Enforcement Act 2007 (Commencement No. 5 and Transitional Provisions) Order 2008 (S.I. 2008/1653)
- Magnetic Toys (Safety) Regulations 2008 (S.I. 2008/1654)
- Electoral Administration Act 2006 (Commencement No.1 and Transitional Provisions) (Northern Ireland) Order 2008 (S.I. 2008/1656)
- National Health Service (Optical Charges and Payments) Amendment (No. 2) Regulations 2008 (S.I. 2008/1657)
- Companies Act 1985 (Annual Return) and Companies (Principal Business Activities) (Amendment) Regulations 2008 (S.I. 2008/1659)
- Cross-border Railway Services (Working Time) Regulations 2008 (S.I. 2008/1660)
- Plastic Materials and Articles in Contact with Food (Wales) (No. 2) Regulations 2008 (S.I. 2008/1682)
- Medicines for Human Use (Prescribing by EEA Practitioners) Regulations 2008 (S.I. 2008/1692)
- Immigration (Registration Card) Order 2008 (S.I. 2008/1693)
- Armed Forces (Alignment of Service Discipline Acts) Order 2008 (S.I. 2008/1694)
- Immigration and Nationality (Fees) (Amendment No. 2) Regulations 2008 (S.I. 2008/1695)
- Armed Forces (Service Complaints) (Consequential Amendments) Order 2008 (S.I. 2008/1696)
- National Health Service (Charges for Drugs and Appliances) and (Travel Expenses and Remission of Charges) Amendment (No. 2) Regulations 2008 (S.I. 2008/1697)
- Armed Forces (Entry, Search and Seizure) (Amendment) Order 2008 (S.I. 2008/1698)
- Courts-Martial (Amendment) Rules 2008 (S.I. 2008/1699)
- Primary Ophthalmic Services Amendment, Transitional and Consequential Provisions Regulations 2008 (S.I. 2008/1700)

== 1701–1800 ==
- Education (Hazardous Equipment and Materials in Schools) (Removal of Restrictions on Use) (England) Regulations 2008 (S.I. 2008/1701)
- Road Vehicles (Construction and Use) (Amendment) Regulations 2008 (S.I. 2008/1702)
- Estate Agents (Redress Scheme) Order 2008 (S.I. 2008/1712)
- Estate Agents (Redress Scheme) (Penalty Charge) Regulations 2008 (S.I. 2008/1713)
- Regulated Covered Bonds (Amendment) Regulations 2008 (S.I. 2008/1714)
- Vehicles Crime (Registration of Registration Plate Suppliers) Regulations 2008 (S.I. 2008/1715)
- Childcare Act 2006 (Provision of Information) (Wales) (Amendment) Regulations 2008 (S.I. 2008/1716)
- North East Wales National Health Service Trust (Dissolution) Order 2008 (S.I. 2008/1717)
- Eggs and Chicks (England) Regulations 2008 (S.I. 2008/1718)
- Conwy and Denbighshire National Health Service Trust (Dissolution) Order 2008 (S.I. 2008/1719)
- Conwy and Denbighshire National Health Service Trust (Transfer of Staff, Property, Rights and Liabilities) Order 2008 (S.I. 2008/1720)
- North East Wales National Health Service Trust (Transfer of Staff, Property, Rights and Liabilities) Order 2008 (S.I. 2008/1721)
- Childcare (Provision of Information About Young Children) (England) Regulations 2008 (S.I. 2008/1722)
- Education (School Inspection etc.) (England) (Amendment) Regulations 2008 (S.I. 2008/1723)
- Local Authority (Duty to Secure Early Years Provision Free of Charge) Regulations 2008 (S.I. 2008/1724)
- Financial Services and Markets Act 2000 (Control of Transfers of Business Done at Lloyd's) (Amendment) Order 2008 (S.I. 2008/1725)
- Service Voters’ Registration Period (Northern Ireland) Order 2008 (S.I. 2008/1726)
- Education (School Performance Information) (England) (Amendment) (No. 2) Regulations 2008 (S.I. 2008/1727)
- Education Act 2002 (Commencement No. 12) (Wales) Order 2008 (S.I. 2008/1728)
- Childcare (Inspections) Regulations 2008 (S.I. 2008/1729)
- Network Access Appeal Rules 2008 (S.I. 2008/1730)
- Adjudicator to Her Majesty's Land Registry (Practice and Procedure) (Amendment) Rules 2008 (S.I. 2008/1731)
- Education (National Curriculum) (Foundation Stage) (Wales) Order 2008 (S.I. 2008/1732)
- South Staffordshire College (Incorporation) Order 2008 (S.I. 2008/1733)
- South Staffordshire College (Government) Regulations 2008 (S.I. 2008/1734)
- Statutory Sick Pay (General) (Amendment) Regulations 2008 (S.I. 2008/1735)
- Education (Disapplication of the National Curriculum for Wales at Key Stage 1) (Wales) Regulations 2008 (S.I. 2008/1736)
- Political Parties, Elections and Referendums Act 2000 (Northern Ireland Political Parties) Order 2008 (S.I. 2008/1737)
- Company Names Adjudicator Rules 2008 (S.I. 2008/1738)
- Education (School Day and School Year) (Wales) (Amendment) Regulations 2008 (S.I. 2008/1739)
- Childcare (Disqualification) (Amendment) Regulations 2008 (S.I. 2008/1740)
- Representation of the People (Northern Ireland) Regulations 2008 (S.I. 2008/1741)
- Pigs (Records, Identification and Movement) (Wales) Order 2008 (S.I. 2008/1742)
- Early Years Foundation Stage (Exemptions from Learning and Development Requirements) Regulations 2008 (S.I. 2008/1743)
- Qualifications and Curriculum Authority (Additional Functions) Order 2008 (S.I. 2008/1744)
- Terrorism Act 2006 (Disapplication of Section 25) Order 2008 (S.I. 2008/1745)
- Rail Vehicle Accessibility (Interoperable Rail System) Regulations 2008 (S.I. 2008/1746)
- Education (Pupil Information) (England) (Amendment) Regulations 2008 (S.I. 2008/1747)
- Land Registration (Network Access) Rules 2008 (S.I. 2008/1748)
- Football Spectators (Seating) Order 2008 (S.I. 2008/1749)
- Land Registration (Electronic Conveyancing) Rules 2008 (S.I. 2008/1750)
- Consumer Credit (Information Requirements and Duration of Licences and Charges) (Amendment) Regulations 2008 (S.I. 2008/1751)
- Education (National Curriculum) (Attainment Targets and Programme of Study in Art and Design in respect of the Third Key Stage) (England) Order 2008 (S.I. 2008/1752)
- Education (National Curriculum) (Attainment Targets and Programmes of Study in Citizenship in respect of the Third and Fourth Key Stages) (England) Order 2008 (S.I. 2008/1753)
- Education (National Curriculum) (Attainment Targets and Programme of Study in Design and Technology in respect of the Third Key Stage) (England) Order 2008 (S.I. 2008/1754)
- Education (National Curriculum) (Attainment Targets and Programmes of Study in English in respect of the Third and Fourth Key Stages) (England) Order 2008 (S.I. 2008/1755)
- Education (National Curriculum) (Attainment Targets and Programme of Study in Geography in respect of the Third Key Stage) (England) Order 2008 (S.I. 2008/1756)
- Education (National Curriculum) (Attainment Targets and Programme of Study in History in respect of the Third Key Stage) (England) Order 2008 (S.I. 2008/1757)
- Education (National Curriculum) (Attainment Targets and Programmes of Study in Information and Communication Technology in respect of the Third and Fourth Key Stages) (England) Order 2008 (S.I. 2008/1758)
- Education (National Curriculum) (Attainment Targets and Programmes of Study in Mathematics in respect of the Third and Fourth Key Stages) (England) Order 2008 (S.I. 2008/1759)
- Education (National Curriculum) (Attainment Targets and Programme of Study in Modern Foreign Languages in respect of the Third Key Stage) (England) Order 2008 (S.I. 2008/1760)
- Education (National Curriculum) (Attainment Targets and Programme of Study in Music in respect of the Third Key Stage) (England) Order 2008 (S.I. 2008/1761)
- Education (National Curriculum) (Attainment Targets and Programmes of Study in Physical Education in respect of the Third and Fourth Key Stages) (England) Order 2008 (S.I. 2008/1762)
- Education (National Curriculum) (Attainment Targets and Programme of Study in Science in respect of the Third Key Stage) (England) Order 2008 (S.I. 2008/1763)
- Civil Enforcement of Parking Contraventions (Dudley) Designation Order 2008 (S.I. 2008/1764)
- Employers’ Liability (Compulsory Insurance) (Amendment) Regulations 2008 (S.I. 2008/1765)
- Education (National Curriculum) (Modern Foreign Languages) (England) Order 2008 (S.I. 2008/1766)
- Climate Change and Sustainable Energy Act 2006 (Sources of Energy and Technologies) Order 2008 (S.I. 2008/1767)
- Persons subject to Immigration Control (Housing Authority Accommodation and Homelessness) (Amendment) Order 2008 (S.I. 2008/1768)
- Sexual Offences (Northern Ireland) Order 2008 (S.I. 2008/1769)
- Double Taxation Relief and International Tax Enforcement (Taxes on Income and Capital) (Saudi Arabia) Order 2008 (S.I. 2008/1770)
- East Devon College, Tiverton (Dissolution) Order 2008 (S.I. 2008/1771)
- Dewsbury College (Dissolution) Order 2008 (S.I. 2008/1772)
- Rochdale Sixth Form College (Incorporation) Order 2008 (S.I. 2008/1773)
- Health Care and Associated Professions (Miscellaneous Amendments) Order 2008 (S.I. 2008/1774)
- North Cumbria Acute Hospitals National Health Service Trust (Change of Name) (Establishment) Amendment Order 2008 (S.I. 2008/1775)
- Scotland Act 1998 (Transfer of Functions to the Scottish Ministers etc.) Order 2008 (S.I. 2008/1776)
- Maximum Number of Judges Order 2008 (S.I. 2008/1777)
- Social Fund Winter Fuel Payment (Temporary Increase) Regulations 2008 (S.I. 2008/1778)
- Sexual Offences (Northern Ireland Consequential Amendments) Order 2008 (S.I. 2008/1779)
- Armed Forces, Army, Air Force and Naval Discipline Acts (Continuation) Order 2008 (S.I. 2008/1780)
- Ministerial and other Salaries Order 2008 (S.I. 2008/1781)
- Air Navigation (Amendment) Order 2008 (S.I. 2008/1782)
- Films Co-Production Agreements (Amendment) Order 2008 (S.I. 2008/1783)
- Inspectors of Education, Children's Services and Skills (No. 3) Order 2008 (S.I. 2008/1784)
- National Assembly for Wales (Legislative Competence) (Social Welfare) Order 2008 (S.I. 2008/1785)
- Welsh Ministers (Transfer of Functions) Order 2008 (S.I. 2008/1786)
- Education (National Curriculum) (Attainment Targets and Programmes of Study) (Wales) (Amendment) Order 2008 (S.I. 2008/1787)
- Scotland Act 1998 (Agency Arrangements) (Specification) (No. 2) Order 2008 (S.I. 2008/1788)
- International Tax Enforcement (Bermuda) Order 2008 (S.I. 2008/1789)
- Rochdale Sixth Form College (Government) Regulations 2008 (S.I. 2008/1790)
- Parliamentary Constituencies and Assembly Electoral Regions (Wales) (Amendment) Order 2008 (S.I. 2008/1791)
- European Communities (Designation) (No. 2) Order 2008 (S.I. 2008/1792)
- Double Taxation Relief and International Tax Enforcement (Taxes on Income and Capital) (New Zealand) Order 2008 (S.I. 2008/1793)
- Merchant Shipping (Liner Conferences) (Gibraltar) (Repeal) Order 2008 (S.I. 2008/1794)
- Double Taxation Relief and International Tax Enforcement (Taxes on Income and Capital) (Moldova) Order 2008 (S.I. 2008/1795)
- Double Taxation Relief and International Tax Enforcement (Taxes on Income and Capital) (Slovenia) Order 2008 (S.I. 2008/1796)
- Trade Marks Rules 2008 (S.I. 2008/1797)
- Children and Adoption Act 2006 (Commencement No. 2) Order 2008 (S.I. 2008/1798)
- Legal Services Act 2007 (Transitory Provision) Order 2008 (S.I. 2008/1799)
- Education (Nutritional Standards and Requirements for School Food) (England) (Amendment) Regulations 2008 (S.I. 2008/1800)

== 1801–1900 ==
- Education (Independent School Inspection Fees and Publication) (England) Regulations 2008 (S.I. 2008/1801)
- Protection of Children and Vulnerable Adults and Care Standards Tribunal (Amendment) Regulations 2008 (S.I. 2008/1802)
- Gambling (Operating licence and Single-Machine Permit Fees) (Amendment) Regulations 2008 (S.I. 2008/1803)
- Childcare (Fees) Regulations 2008 (S.I. 2008/1804)
- Trade in Goods (Categories of Controlled Goods) Order 2008 (S.I. 2008/1805)
- Feeding Stuffs (Wales) (Amendment) Regulations 2008 (S.I. 2008/1806)
- Adoptions with a Foreign Element (Special Restrictions on Adoptions from Abroad) Regulations 2008 (S.I. 2008/1807)
- Special Restrictions on Adoptions from Abroad (Cambodia) Order 2008 (S.I. 2008/1808)
- Special Restrictions on Adoptions from Abroad (Guatemala) Order 2008 (S.I. 2008/1809)
- Pension Protection Fund (Entry Rules) Amendment Regulations 2008 (S.I. 2008/1810)
- Shrimp Fishing Nets (Wales) Order 2008 (S.I. 2008/1811)
- North Tees Teaching Primary Care Trust (Change of Name) Order 2008 (S.I. 2008/1812)
- Financial Services and Markets Act 2000 (Collective Investment Schemes) (Amendment) (No. 2) Order 2008 (S.I. 2008/1813)
- Stamp Duty and Stamp Duty Reserve Tax (Investment Exchanges and Clearing Houses) (European Central Counterparty Limited and the Turquoise Multilateral Trading Facility) Regulations 2008 (S.I. 2008/1814)
- Cancellation of Contracts made in a Consumer's Home or Place of Work etc. Regulations 2008 (S.I. 2008/1816)
- Port of Tyne Harbour Revision Order 2008 (S.I. 2008/1817)
- UK Borders Act 2007 (Commencement No. 3 and Transitional Provisions) Order 2008 (S.I. 2008/1818)
- Immigration (Notices) (Amendment) (No. 2) Regulations 2008 (S.I. 2008/1819)
- Competition Act 1998 (Public Policy Exclusion) Order 2008 (S.I. 2008/1820)
- Alternative Finance Arrangements (Community Investment Tax Relief) Order 2008 (S.I. 2008/1821)
- General Dental Council (Continuing Professional Development) (Dentists) Rules Order of Council 2008 (S.I. 2008/1822)
- General Dental Council (Continuing Professional Development) (Professions Complementary to Dentistry) Rules Order of Council 2008 (S.I. 2008/1823)
- Veterinary Surgeons’ Qualifications (European Recognition) Regulations 2008 (S.I. 2008/1824)
- Community Emissions Trading Scheme (Allocation of Allowances for Payment) Regulations 2008 (S.I. 2008/1825)
- Social Security (Students Responsible for Children or Young Persons) Amendment Regulations 2008 (S.I. 2008/1826)
- Local Authorities (Conduct of Referendums) (Wales) Regulations 2008 (S.I. 2008/1848)
- Army Terms of Service (Amendment etc.) Regulations 2008 (S.I. 2008/1849)
- Council Tax Limitation (Maximum Amounts) (England) Order 2008 (S.I. 2008/1850)
- Mental Capacity (Deprivation of Liberty: Standard Authorisations, Assessments and Ordinary Residence) Regulations 2008 (S.I. 2008/1858)
- East Kent Hospitals National Health Service Trust (Change of Name) (Establishment) Amendment Order 2008 (S.I. 2008/1859)
- Companies (Welsh Language Forms) (Amendment) Regulations 2008 (S.I. 2008/1860)
- Companies (Forms) (Amendment) Regulations 2008 (S.I. 2008/1861)
- Road Safety Act 2006 (Commencement No. 3) (England and Wales) Order 2008 (S.I. 2008/1862)
- Serious Crime Act 2007 (Appeals under Section 24) Order 2008 (S.I. 2008/1863)
- Road Safety Act 2006 (Commencement No. 3) Order 2008 (S.I. 2008/1864)
- Probate Services (Approved Bodies) Order 2008 (S.I. 2008/1865)
- School Budget Shares (Prescribed Purposes and Consequential Amendments) (Wales) Regulations 2008 (S.I. 2008/1866)
- King's Stanley CofE Primary School (Designation as having a Religious Character) Order 2008 (S.I. 2008/1867)
- Krishna-Avanti Primary School (Designation as having a Religious Character) Order 2008 (S.I. 2008/1868)
- Manor CE VC Primary School (Designation as having a Religious Character) Order 2008 (S.I. 2008/1869)
- Norham St Ceolwulfs CofE Controlled First School (Designation as having a Religious Character) Order 2008 (S.I. 2008/1870)
- St Saviour's Catholic Primary School (Designation as having a Religious Character) Order 2008 (S.I. 2008/1871)
- Thatcham Park Church of England Primary School (Designation as having a Religious Character) Order 2008 (S.I. 2008/1872)
- Towcester CofE Primary School (Designation as having a Religious Character) Order 2008 (S.I. 2008/1873)
- Arnot St Mary CE Primary School (Designation as having a Religious Character) Order 2008 (S.I. 2008/1874)
- All Saints CE (Aided) Primary School (Designation as having a Religious Character) Order 2008 (S.I. 2008/1875)
- Bellefield Primary and Nursery School (Designation as having a Religious Character) Order 2008 (S.I. 2008/1876)
- Local Involvement Networks (Amendment) Regulations 2008 (S.I. 2008/1877)
- Finance Act 2006, Section 28 (Appointed Day) Order 2008 (S.I. 2008/1878)
- Employment and Support Allowance (Consequential Provisions) (No. 3) Regulations 2008 (S.I. 2008/1879)
- Finance Act 2007, Section 50 (Appointed Day) Order 2008 (S.I. 2008/1880)
- Transmissible Spongiform Encephalopathies (England) Regulations 2008 (S.I. 2008/1881)
- Pensions Act 2004 (Code of Practice) (Dispute Resolution) Appointed Day Order 2008 (S.I. 2008/1882)
- Education (Specified Work and Registration) (England) (Amendment) Regulations 2008 (S.I. 2008/1883)
- General Teaching Council for England (Eligibility for Provisional Registration) Regulations 2008 (S.I. 2008/1884)
- Beer, Cider and Perry and Wine and Made–wine (Amendment) Regulations 2008 (S.I. 2008/1885)
- Companies Act 2006 (Commencement No. 7, Transitional Provisions and Savings) Order 2008 (S.I. 2008/1886)
- Police Pensions (Amendment) Regulations 2008 (S.I. 2008/1887)
- Origin of Renewables Electricity (Power of Gas and Electricity Markets Authority to act for Northern Ireland Authority for Utility Regulation) Regulations 2008 (S.I. 2008/1888)
- Housing (Scotland) Act 2006 (Consequential Provisions) Order 2008 (S.I. 2008/1889)
- Welsh Language Schemes (Public Bodies) Order 2008 (S.I. 2008/1890)
- Superannuation (Admission to Schedule 1 to the Superannuation Act 1972) Order 2008 (S.I. 2008/1891)
- Value Added Tax (Finance) Order 2008 (S.I. 2008/1892)
- Venture Capital Trust (Amendment) Regulations 2008 (S.I. 2008/1893)
- National Minimum Wage Regulations 1999 (Amendment) Regulations 2008 (S.I. 2008/1894)
- Civil Enforcement of Parking Contraventions (City and County of Swansea) Designation Order 2008 (S.I. 2008/1896)
- Companies (Trading Disclosures) (Insolvency) Regulations 2008 (S.I. 2008/1897)
- Gas and Electricity (Consumer Complaints Handling Standards) Regulations 2008 (S.I. 2008/1898)
- School Curriculum in Wales (Miscellaneous Amendments) Order 2008 (S.I. 2008/1899)
- Mental Health Act 2007 (Commencement No. 7 and Transitional Provisions) Order 2008 (S.I. 2008/1900)

== 1901–2000 ==
- Representation of the People (Amendment) Regulations 2008 (S.I. 2008/1901)
- NHS Foundation Trusts (Trust Funds: Appointment of Trustees) Amendment Order 2008 (S.I. 2008/1902)
- Financial Assistance Scheme (Miscellaneous Amendments) Regulations 2008 (S.I. 2008/1903)
- Children Act 2004 (Commencement No. 8) (Wales) Order 2008 (S.I. 2008/1904)
- Insurance Companies (Corporation Tax Acts) (Amendment) Order 2008 (S.I. 2008/1905)
- Insurance Companies (Calculation of Profits: Policy Holders’ Tax) (Amendment) Regulations 2008 (S.I. 2008/1906)
- Whole of Government Accounts (Designation of Bodies) (No. 2) Order 2008 (S.I. 2008/1907)
- Serious Organised Crime and Police Act 2005 (Disclosure of Information by SOCA) Order 2008 (S.I. 2008/1908)
- Proceeds of Crime Act 2002 (Disclosure of Information) Order 2008 (S.I. 2008/1909)
- Limited Liability Partnerships (Accounts and Audit) (Application of Companies Act 2006) Regulations 2008 (S.I. 2008/1911)
- Small Limited Liability Partnerships (Accounts) Regulations 2008 (S.I. 2008/1912)
- Large and Medium-sized Limited Liability Partnerships (Accounts) Regulations 2008 (S.I. 2008/1913)
- European Parliamentary Elections (Returning Officers) Order 2008 (S.I. 2008/1914)
- Companies (Reduction of Share Capital) Order 2008 (S.I. 2008/1915)
- Capital Allowances (Energy-saving Plant and Machinery) (Amendment) Order 2008 (S.I. 2008/1916)
- Capital Allowances (Environmentally Beneficial Plant and Machinery) (Amendment) Order 2008 (S.I. 2008/1917)
- Road Safety Act 2006 (Commencement No. 4) Order 2008 (S.I. 2008/1918)
- Land Registration (Amendment) Rules 2008 (S.I. 2008/1919)
- Commonhold (Land Registration) (Amendment) Rules 2008 (S.I. 2008/1920)
- Land Registration (Proper Office) (Amendment) Order 2008 (S.I. 2008/1921)
- Water Act 2003 (Commencement No. 8) Order 2008 (S.I. 2008/1922)
- Insurance Companies (Taxation of Insurance Special Purpose Vehicles) Order 2008 (S.I. 2008/1923)
- Overseas Life Insurance Companies (Amendment) Regulations 2008 (S.I. 2008/1924)
- Finance Act 2008, Section 30 (Appointed Day) Order 2008 (S.I. 2008/1925)
- Financing-Arrangement-Funded Transfers to Shareholders Regulations 2008 (S.I. 2008/1926)
- Wildlife and Countryside Act 1981 (Variation of Schedule 5) (Wales) Order 2008 (S.I. 2008/1927)
- Finance Act 2008, Section 29 (Appointed Day) Order 2008 (S.I. 2008/1928)
- Finance Act 2008, Section 28 (Appointed Day) Order 2008 (S.I. 2008/1929)
- Finance Act 2008, Section 27 (Appointed Day) Order 2008 (S.I. 2008/1930)
- Terrorism Act 2000 (Proscribed Organisations) (Amendment) (No. 2) Order 2008 (S.I. 2008/1931)
- Stamp Duty Land Tax (Zero-Carbon Homes Relief) (Amendment) Regulations 2008 (S.I. 2008/1932)
- Finance Act 2008, Section 26 (Appointed Day) Order 2008 (S.I. 2008/1933)
- Individual Savings Account (Amendment No. 2) Regulations 2008 (S.I. 2008/1934)
- Finance Act 2008, Schedule 38, (Appointed Day) Order 2008 (S.I. 2008/1935)
- Finance Act 2008 Section 135 (Disaster or Emergency) Order 2008 (S.I. 2008/1936)
- Friendly Societies (Modification of the Corporation Tax Acts) (Amendment) Regulations 2008 (S.I. 2008/1937)
- Health Service Branded Medicines (Control of Prices and Supply of Information) Regulations 2008 (S.I. 2008/1938)
- Community Emissions Trading Scheme (Allocation of Allowances for Payment) (Amendment) Regulations 2008 (S.I. 2008/1939)
- General Optical Council (Therapeutics and Contact Lens Specialties) Rules Order of Council 2008 (S.I. 2008/1940)
- Producer Responsibility Obligations (Packaging Waste) (Amendment No. 2) Regulations 2008 (S.I. 2008/1941)
- Friendly Societies (Transfers of Other Business) (Modification of the Corporation Tax Acts) Regulations 2008 (S.I. 2008/1942)
- Air Navigation (Dangerous Goods) (Amendment) Regulations 2008 (S.I. 2008/1943)
- Insurance Companies (Taxation of Reinsurance Business) (Amendment) Regulations 2008 (S.I. 2008/1944)
- Insurance Premium Tax (Amendment) Regulations 2008 (S.I. 2008/1945)
- Registered Pension Schemes (Transfer of Sums and Assets) (Amendment) Regulations 2008 (S.I. 2008/1946)
- Tax Avoidance Schemes (Information) (Amendment) Regulations 2008 (S.I. 2008/1947)
- Taxes (Fees for Payment by Telephone) Regulations 2008 (S.I. 2008/1948)
- Gaming Duty (Amendment) Regulations 2008 (S.I. 2008/1949)
- Insurance Accounts Directive (Lloyd's Syndicate and Aggregate Accounts) Regulations 2008 (S.I. 2008/1950)
- A282 Trunk Road (Dartford-Thurrock Crossing Charging Scheme) Order 2008 (S.I. 2008/1951)
- Early Years Foundation Stage (Learning and Development Requirements) (Amendment) Order 2008 (S.I. 2008/1952)
- Early Years Foundation Stage (Welfare Requirements) (Amendment) Regulations 2008 (S.I. 2008/1953)
- European Parliament (Number of MEPs and Distribution between Electoral Regions) (United Kingdom and Gibraltar) Order 2008 (S.I. 2008/1954)
- Child Support Commissioners (Procedure) (Amendment) Regulations 2008 (S.I. 2008/1955)
- Road User Charging (Enforcement and Adjudication) (London) (Amendment) Regulations 2008 (S.I. 2008/1956)
- Social Security and Child Support (Decisions and Appeals) (Amendment) Regulations 2008 (S.I. 2008/1957)
- Trade Marks (Fees) Rules 2008 (S.I. 2008/1958)
- Community Trade Mark (Amendment) Regulations 2008 (S.I. 2008/1959)
- Commons Act 2006 (Commencement No. 4 and Savings) (England) Order 2008 (S.I. 2008/1960)
- Commons Registration (England) Regulations 2008 (S.I. 2008/1961)
- Dartmoor Commons (Authorised Severance) Order 2008 (S.I. 2008/1962)
- Mesothelioma Lump Sum Payments (Conditions and Amounts) Regulations 2008 (S.I. 2008/1963)
- Export Control (Democratic Republic of Congo) (Amendment) (No. 2) Order 2008 (S.I. 2008/1964)
- Vehicle Drivers (Certificates of Professional Competence) (Amendment) (No. 2) Regulations 2008 (S.I. 2008/1965)
- Maternity and Parental Leave etc. and the Paternity and Adoption Leave (Amendment) Regulations 2008 (S.I. 2008/1966)
- Freedom of Information (Parliament and National Assembly for Wales) Order 2008 (S.I. 2008/1967)
- Payments to the Churches Conservation Trust Order 2008 (S.I. 2008/1968)
- Legal Officers (Annual Fees) Order 2008 (S.I. 2008/1969)
- Ecclesiastical Judges, Legal Officers and Others (Fees) Order 2008 (S.I. 2008/1970)
- Education and Inspections Act 2006 (Commencement No. 7 and Transitional Provisions) Order 2008 (S.I. 2008/1971)
- Health Act 2006 (Commencement No. 5) Order 2008 (S.I. 2008/1972)
- Adventure Activities Licensing (Amendment) Regulations 2008 (S.I. 2008/1973)
- Northern Ireland (Sentences) Act 1998 (Specified Organisations) Order 2008 (S.I. 2008/1975)
- Private Dentistry (Wales) Regulations 2008 (S.I. 2008/1976)
- Crown Office Fees Order 2008 (S.I. 2008/1977)
- Proceeds of Crime Act 2002 (Investigative Powers of Prosecutors in England, Wales and Northern Ireland: Code of Practice) Order 2008 (S.I. 2008/1978)
- Personal and Occupational Pension Schemes (Amendment) Regulations 2008 (S.I. 2008/1979)
- Tractor etc. (EC Type-Approval) (Amendment) Regulations 2008 (S.I. 2008/1980)

== 2001–2100 ==
- Non-Road Mobile Machinery (Emission of Gaseous and Particulate Pollutants) (Amendment) Regulations 2008 (S.I. 2008/2011)
- Child Maintenance and Other Payments Act 2008 (Commencement No. 2) Order 2008 (S.I. 2008/2033)
- Crossrail (Qualifying Authorities) Order 2008 (S.I. 2008/2034)
- Designation of Rural Primary Schools (England) Order 2008 (S.I. 2008/2035)
- Crossrail (Nomination) Order 2008 (S.I. 2008/2036)
- Greater London Authority Act 2007 (Commencement No. 5) Order 2008 (S.I. 2008/2037)
- London Waste and Recycling Board Order 2008 (S.I. 2008/2038)
- Criminal Justice Act 1988 (Offensive Weapons) (Amendment No. 2) Order 2008 (S.I. 2008/2039)
- Ministry of Defence Police Appeal Tribunals (Amendment) Regulations 2008 (S.I. 2008/2059)
- Milk and Milk Products (Pupils in Educational Establishments) (England) Regulations 2008 (S.I. 2008/2072)
- Criminal Procedure (Amendment) Rules 2008 (S.I. 2008/2076)
- Immigration (Supply of Information to the Secretary of State for Immigration Purposes) Order 2008 (S.I. 2008/2077)
- Christ The King Catholic and Church of England (VA) Centre For Learning (Designation as having a Religious Character) Order 2008 (S.I. 2008/2078)
- Canon Sharples Church of England Primary School and Nursery (Designation as having a Religious Character) Order 2008 (S.I. 2008/2079)
- Cleadon Village Church of England VA Primary School (Designation as having a Religious Character) Order 2008 (S.I. 2008/2080)
- Hackleton CofE Primary School (Designation as having a Religious Character) Order 2008 (S.I. 2008/2081)
- Hawthorn Church of England Controlled First School (Designation as having a Religious Character) Order 2008 (S.I. 2008/2082)
- Trinity Anglican-Methodist Primary School (Designation as having a Religious Character) Order 2008 (S.I. 2008/2083)
- Wylye Valley Church of England Voluntary Aided Primary School (Designation as having a Religious Character) Order 2008 (S.I. 2008/2084)
- St Gregory's Catholic Primary School (Designation as having a Religious Character) Order 2008 (S.I. 2008/2085)
- International Development Association (Multilateral Debt Relief Initiative) (Amendment) Order 2008 (S.I. 2008/2086)
- Canon Peter Hall CofE Primary School (Designation as having a Religious Character) Order 2008 (S.I. 2008/2087)
- African Development Bank (Eleventh Replenishment of the African Development Fund) Order 2008 (S.I. 2008/2088)
- African Development Fund (Multilateral Debt Relief Initiative) (Amendment) Order 2008 (S.I. 2008/2089)
- International Development Association (Fifteenth Replenishment) Order 2008 (S.I. 2008/2090)
- Concessionary Bus Travel (Permits) (England) (Amendment) Regulations 2008 (S.I. 2008/2091)
- All Saints CofE School (Designation as having a Religious Character) Order 2008 (S.I. 2008/2092)
- Town and Country Planning (Environmental Impact Assessment) (Amendment) (England) Regulations 2008 (S.I. 2008/2093)
- Education (Student Support) (Amendment) (No. 2) Regulations 2008 (S.I. 2008/2094)
- Removal, Storage and Disposal of Vehicles (Prescribed Sums and Charges) Regulations 2008 (S.I. 2008/2095)
- Police (Retention and Disposal of Motor Vehicles) (Amendment) Regulations 2008 (S.I. 2008/2096)
- Road Traffic Act 1988 (Retention and Disposal of Seized Motor Vehicles) (Amendment) Regulations 2008 (S.I. 2008/2097)
- Judicial Discipline (Prescribed Procedures) (Amendment) Regulations 2008 (S.I. 2008/2098)
- School Teachers’ Incentive Payments (England) Order 2008 (S.I. 2008/2099)

== 2101–2200 ==
- Welfare Reform Act 2007 (Commencement No. 7, Transitional and Savings Provisions) Order 2008 (S.I. 2008/2101)
- Dartmouth-Kingswear Floating Bridge (Vehicle Classifications & Revision of Charges) Order 2008 (S.I. 2008/2102)
- Vaccine Damage Payments (Specified Disease) Order 2008 (S.I. 2008/2103)
- Wireless Telegraphy (Register) (Amendment) (No. 2) Regulations 2008 (S.I. 2008/2104)
- Wireless Telegraphy (Spectrum Trading) (Amendment) (No. 2) Regulations 2008 (S.I. 2008/2105)
- Wireless Telegraphy (Licence Charges) (Amendment) (No. 2) Regulations 2008 (S.I. 2008/2106)
- A421 Trunk Road (M1 Junction 13 to Bedford Improvements and Detrunking) Order 2008 (S.I. 2008/2107)
- Export and Import of Dangerous Chemicals Regulations 2008 (S.I. 2008/2108)
- A421 Trunk Road(M1 Junction 13 Improvements) Order 2008 (S.I. 2008/2109)
- M1 Motorway (Junction 13 and Connecting Roads) Order 2008 (S.I. 2008/2110)
- Social Security (Child Maintenance Amendments) Regulations 2008 (S.I. 2008/2111)
- Social Security (Use of Information for Housing Benefit and Welfare Services Purposes) Regulations 2008 (S.I. 2008/2112)
- Local Government (Structural Changes) (Transitional Arrangements) Regulations 2008 (S.I. 2008/2113)
- Welfare Reform Act (Relevant Enactment) Order 2008 (S.I. 2008/2114)
- Assembly Learning Grants and Loans (Higher Education) (Wales) (Amendment) Regulations 2008 (S.I. 2008/2140)
- School Milk (Wales) Regulations 2008 (S.I. 2008/2141)
- Transport Tribunal (Amendment) Rules 2008 (S.I. 2008/2142)
- Police Act 1997 (Criminal Records) (Amendment) Regulations 2008 (S.I. 2008/2143)
- Education (School Teachers’ Pay and Conditions) Order 2008 (S.I. 2008/2155)
- Crime (International Co-operation) Act 2003 (Designation of Participating Countries) (England, Wales and Northern Ireland) Order 2008 (S.I. 2008/2156)
- Offshore Installations (Safety Zones) (No. 2) Order 2008 (S.I. 2008/2157)
- Disability Discrimination (General Qualifications Bodies)(Relevant Qualifications, Reasonable Steps and Physical Features)(Amendment) Regulations 2008 (S.I. 2008/2159)
- Armed Forces and Reserve Forces (Compensation Scheme) (Amendment No. 2) Order 2008 (S.I. 2008/2160)
- Enterprise Act 2002 (Bodies Designated to make Super-complaints) (Amendment) Order 2008 (S.I. 2008/2161)
- Planning and Compulsory Purchase Act 2004 (Commencement No.4 and Consequential, Transitional and Savings Provisions) (Wales) (Amendment No. 2) Order 2008 (S.I. 2008/2162)
- Crime and Disorder Act 1998 (Responsible Authorities) Order 2008 (S.I. 2008/2163)
- Batteries and Accumulators (Placing on the Market) Regulations 2008 (S.I. 2008/2164)
- Merchant Shipping and Fishing Vessels (Provision and Use of Work Equipment) (Amendment) Regulations 2008 (S.I. 2008/2165)
- Merchant Shipping and Fishing Vessels (Lifting Operations and Lifting Equipment) (Amendment) Regulations 2008 (S.I. 2008/2166)
- Excise Duties (Road Fuel Gas) (Reliefs) Regulations 2008 (S.I. 2008/2167)
- Excise Duties (Surcharges or Rebates) (Hydrocarbon Oils etc.) Order 2008 (S.I. 2008/2168)
- Tax Credits (Miscellaneous Amendments) (No. 2) Regulations 2008 (S.I. 2008/2169)
- Income Tax (Qualifying Child Care) Regulations 2008 (S.I. 2008/2170)
- Dartford-Thurrock Crossing (Amendment) Regulations 2008 (S.I. 2008/2171)
- Conservation (Natural Habitats, &c.) (Amendment) (England and Wales) Regulations 2008 (S.I. 2008/2172)
- Cosmetic Products (Safety) (Amendment) Regulations 2008 (S.I. 2008/2173)
- Crossrail (Fees for Requests for Planning Approval) Regulations 2008 (S.I. 2008/2175)
- Local Government (Structural Changes) (Transfer of Functions, Property, Rights and Liabilities) Regulations 2008 (S.I. 2008/2176)
- Traffic Signs (Amendment) Regulations and General Directions 2008 (S.I. 2008/2177)
- Civil Procedure (Amendment) Rules 2008 (S.I. 2008/2178)

== 2201–2300 ==
- Trade Marks (International Registration) Order 2008 (S.I. 2008/2206)
- Trade Marks (Fees) Revocation Rules 2008 (S.I. 2008/2207)
- Health and Social Care Act 2008 (Commencement No.1) Order 2008 (S.I. 2008/2214)
- Health and Social Care Act 2008 (Consequential Amendments and Transitory Provisions) Order 2008 (S.I. 2008/2250)
- National Health Service (Charges to Overseas Visitors) (Amendment) Regulations 2008 (S.I. 2008/2251)
- Care Quality Commission (Membership) Regulations 2008 (S.I. 2008/2252)
- A1 Motorway (Dishforth to Barton Section and Connecting Roads) Scheme 2008 (S.I. 2008/2253)
- A1 Trunk Road (Dishforth to Barton) (Detrunking) Order 2008 (S.I. 2008/2254)
- Public Contracts and Utilities Contracts (CPV Code Amendments) Regulations 2008 (S.I. 2008/2256)
- Town and Country Planning (Trees) (Amendment) (England) Regulations 2008 (S.I. 2008/2260)
- Childcare Act 2006 (Commencement No. 5 and Savings and Transitional Provisions) Order 2008 (S.I. 2008/2261)
- A1(M) Motorway and the M62 Motorway (Holmfield Interchange Link Roads) (Speed Limit) Regulations 2008 (S.I. 2008/2262)
- National Health Service Pension Scheme and Injury Benefits (Amendment) Regulations 2008 (S.I. 2008/2263)
- Tonnage Tax (Training Requirement) (Amendment) Regulations 2008 (S.I. 2008/2264)
- Social Fund (Applications and Miscellaneous Provisions) Regulations 2008 (S.I. 2008/2265)
- Vehicle Excise Duty (Immobilisation, Removal and Disposal of Vehicles) (Amendment) Regulations 2008 (S.I. 2008/2266)
- Postal Services Regulated Providers (Redress Scheme) Order 2008 (S.I. 2008/2267)
- Gas and Electricity Regulated Providers (Redress Scheme) Order 2008 (S.I. 2008/2268)
- Transmissible Spongiform Encephalopathies (Fees) (England) Regulations 2008 (S.I. 2008/2269)
- Zoonoses and Animal By-Products (Fees) (England) Regulations 2008 (S.I. 2008/2270)
- Veterinary Medicines Regulations 2008 (S.I. 2008/2297)
- Housing Benefit and Council Tax Benefit (Amendment) Regulations 2008 (S.I. 2008/2299)
- Trade Marks (Amendment) Rules 2008 (S.I. 2008/2300)

== 2301–2400 ==
- Pensions Act 2007 (Actuarial Guidance) (Consequential Provisions) Order 2008 (S.I. 2008/2301)
- Finance Act 1998, Schedule 2 (Assessments in Respect of Drawback) (Appointed Day) Order 2008 (S.I. 2008/2302)
- Health and Safety (Enforcing Authority for Railways and Other Guided Transport Systems) (Amendment) Regulations 2008 (S.I. 2008/2323)
- Valuation for Rating (Plant and Machinery) (England) (Amendment) Regulations 2008 (S.I. 2008/2332)
- Non-Domestic Rating (Communications Hereditaments) (Valuation, Alteration of Lists and Appeals and Material Day) (England) Regulations 2008 (S.I. 2008/2333)
- Building (Electronic Communications) Order 2008 (S.I. 2008/2334)
- Town and Country Planning (Environmental Impact Assessment) (Amendment) (Wales) Regulations 2008 (S.I. 2008/2335)
- Town and Country Planning (General Development Procedure) (Amendment) (Wales) Order 2008 (S.I. 2008/2336)
- Chemicals (Hazard Information and Packaging for Supply) (Amendment) Regulations 2008 (S.I. 2008/2337)
- Stamp Duty Land Tax (Variation of Part 4 of the Finance Act 2003) Regulations 2008 (S.I. 2008/2338)
- Stamp Duty Land Tax (Exemption of Certain Acquisitions of Residential Property) Regulations 2008 (S.I. 2008/2339)
- Designation of Schools Having a Religious Character (Independent Schools) (England) (No. 2) Order 2008 (S.I. 2008/2340)
- Legal Services Act 2007 (Transitional, Savings and Consequential Provisions) (Scotland) Order 2008 (S.I. 2008/2341)
- Smoke Control Areas (Authorised Fuels) (England) (Amendment) Regulations 2008 (S.I. 2008/2342)
- Smoke Control Areas (Exempted Fireplaces) (England) (No. 2) Order 2008 (S.I. 2008/2343)
- Civil Enforcement of Parking Contraventions (County of Buckinghamshire) (District of Wycombe) Designation Order 2008 (S.I. 2008/2344)
- Housing (Approval of a Code of Management Practice) (Student Accommodation) (England) Order 2008 (S.I. 2008/2345)
- Houses in Multiple Occupation (Specified Educational Establishments) (England) Regulations 2008 (S.I. 2008/2346)
- Sea Fishing (Recovery Measures) Order 2008 (S.I. 2008/2347)
- Nitrate Pollution Prevention Regulations 2008 (S.I. 2008/2349)
- A465 Trunk Road (Llangua Bridge to A49/A465 Belmont Roundabout) (Detrunking) Order 2008 (S.I. 2008/2350)
- Private and Voluntary Health Care (England) Amendment Regulations 2008 (S.I. 2008/2352)
- Serious Crime Act 2007 (Specified Anti-fraud Organisations) Order 2008 (S.I. 2008/2353)
- Postal Services (Consumer Complaints Handling Standards) Regulations 2008 (S.I. 2008/2355)
- Wildlife and Countryside Act 1981 (Variation of Schedule 4) (England) Order 2008 (S.I. 2008/2356)
- Wildlife and Countryside (Registration and Ringing of Certain Captive Birds) (Amendment) (England) Regulations 2008 (S.I. 2008/2357)
- Housing and Regeneration Act 2008 (Commencement No. 1 and Transitional Provision) Order 2008 (S.I. 2008/2358)
- Harwich Haven Harbour Revision Order 2008 (S.I. 2008/2359)
- Fal & Helford Designated Area (Fishing Restrictions) Order 2008 (S.I. 2008/2360)
- Housing (Right to Manage) (England) Regulations 2008 (S.I. 2008/2361)
- Town and Country Planning (General Permitted Development) (Amendment) (No. 2) (England) Order 2008 (S.I. 2008/2362)
- Energy Performance of Buildings (Certificates and Inspections) (England and Wales) (Amendment No.2) Regulations 2008 (S.I. 2008/2363)
- National Health Service (Charges to Overseas Visitors) (Amendment) (Wales) Regulations 2008 (S.I. 2008/2364)
- Social Security (Miscellaneous Amendments) (No. 3) Regulations 2008 (S.I. 2008/2365)
- Channel Tunnel (International Arrangements) (Amendment) Order 2008 (S.I. 2008/2366)
- Removal and Disposal of Vehicles (Traffic Officers) (England) Regulations 2008 (S.I. 2008/2367)
- Mental Capacity (Deprivation of Liberty: Appointment of Relevant Person's Representative) (Amendment) Regulations 2008 (S.I. 2008/2368)
- Disabled Facilities Grants (Maximum Amounts and Additional Purposes) (Wales) Order 2008 (S.I. 2008/2370)
- Regulatory Enforcement and Sanctions Act 2008 (Commencement No 1) Order 2008 (S.I. 2008/2371)
- Sale of Registration Marks (Amendment) Regulations 2008 (S.I. 2008/2372)
- Gas (Applications for Licences and Extensions and Restrictions of Licences) Regulations 2008 (S.I. 2008/2375)
- Electricity (Applications for Licences, Modifications of an Area and Extensions and Restrictions of Licences) Regulations 2008 (S.I. 2008/2376)
- Housing Renewal Grants (Amendment) (Wales) Regulations 2008 (S.I. 2008/2377)

== 2401–2500 ==
- Plant Health (England) (Amendment) Order 2008 (S.I. 2008/2411)
- Social Security (Miscellaneous Amendments) (No.4) Regulations 2008 (S.I. 2008/2424)
- Local Government Pension Scheme (Miscellaneous) Regulations 2008 (S.I. 2008/2425)
- Wireless Telegraphy (Exemption) (Amendment) (No. 2) Regulations 2008 (S.I. 2008/2426)
- Wireless Telegraphy (Mobile Communication Services on Aircraft – MCA) (Exemption) Regulations 2008 (S.I. 2008/2427)
- Employment and Support Allowance (Miscellaneous Amendments) Regulations 2008 (S.I. 2008/2428)
- Air Navigation (Dangerous Goods) (Amendment) (No. 2) Regulations 2008 (S.I. 2008/2429)
- Criminal Defence Service (Recovery of Defence Costs Orders) (Amendment) Regulations 2008 (S.I. 2008/2430)
- Dudley and Walsall Mental Health Partnership National Health Service Trust (Establishment) Order 2008 (S.I. 2008/2431)
- Local Government and Public Involvement in Health Act 2007 (Commencement No.7) Order 2008 (S.I. 2008/2434)
- Isle of Wight (Electoral Changes) Order 2008 (S.I. 2008/2435)
- Mental Health (Approval of Persons to be Approved Mental Health Professionals) (Wales) Regulations 2008 (S.I. 2008/2436)
- Mental Health (Independent Mental Health Advocates) (Wales) Regulations 2008 (S.I. 2008/2437)
- Abertawe Bro Morgannwg University National Health Service Trust (Transfer of Property, Rights and Liabilities) Order 2008 (S.I. 2008/2438)
- Mental Health (Hospital, Guardianship, Community Treatment and Consent to Treatment) (Wales) Regulations 2008 (S.I. 2008/2439)
- Mental Health (Conflicts of Interest) (Wales) Regulations 2008 (S.I. 2008/2440)
- Mental Health (Nurses) (Wales) Order 2008 (S.I. 2008/2441)
- Civil Enforcement of Parking Contraventions (County of East Sussex) (Borough of Eastbourne) Designation Order 2008 (S.I. 2008/2442)
- North Wales National Health Service Trust (Transfer of Property, Rights and Liabilities) Order 2008 (S.I. 2008/2443)
- Consumer Credit Act 2006 (Commencement No. 4 and Transitional Provisions) (Amendment) Order 2008 (S.I. 2008/2444)
- Infant Formula and Follow-on Formula (England) (Amendment) Regulations 2008 (S.I. 2008/2445)
- Family Proceedings (Amendment) Rules 2008 (S.I. 2008/2446)
- Family Procedure (Adoption) (Amendment) Rules 2008 (S.I. 2008/2447)
- Costs in Criminal Cases (General) (Amendment) Regulations 2008 (S.I. 2008/2448)
- Primary Ophthalmic Services and National Health Service (Optical Charges and Payments) Amendment Regulations 2008 (S.I. 2008/2449)
- Occupational and Personal Pension Schemes (Transfer Values) (Amendment) Regulations 2008 (S.I. 2008/2450)
- Offshore Installations (Safety Zones) (No.3) Order 2008 (S.I. 2008/2454)
- Parochial Fees Order 2008 (S.I. 2008/2470)
- National Health Service (Directions by Strategic Health Authorities to Primary Care Trusts Regarding Arrangements for Involvement) Regulations 2008 (S.I. 2008/2496)
- Health and Social Care Act 2008 (Commencement No.2) Order 2008 (S.I. 2008/2497)
- Non-Domestic Rating (Unoccupied Property) (Wales) Regulations 2008 (S.I. 2008/2499)
- Common Agricultural Policy Single Payment and Support Schemes (Wales) (Amendment) Regulations 2008 (S.I. 2008/2500)

== 2501–2600 ==
- Veterinary Surgeons (Examination of Commonwealth and Foreign Candidates) (Amendment) Regulations Order of Council 2008 (S.I. 2008/2501)
- A4123 Trunk Road (Sandwell and Dudley) (Detrunking) Order 2008 (S.I. 2008/2502)
- Police and Justice Act 2006 (Commencement No. 9) Order 2008 (S.I. 2008/2503)
- Serious Crime Act 2007 (Commencement No. 3) Order 2008 (S.I. 2008/2504)
- Student Fees (Amounts) (England) (Amendment) Regulations 2008 (S.I. 2008/2507)
- Motor Vehicles (Driving Licences) (Amendment) (No. 5) Regulations 2008 (S.I. 2008/2508)
- A570 Trunk Road (North of M58 to the Lancashire County Boundary) (Detrunking) Order 2008 (S.I. 2008/2510)
- A570 Trunk Road (Lancashire County Boundary to the Kew roundabout) (Detrunking) Order 2008 (S.I. 2008/2511)
- Felixstowe Branch Line and Ipswich Yard Improvement Order 2008 (SI 2008/2512)
- Child Support (Consequential Provisions) Regulations 2008 (S.I. 2008/2543)
- Child Support (Miscellaneous Amendments) (No. 2) Regulations 2008 (S.I. 2008/2544)
- Child Support, Pensions and Social Security Act 2000 (Commencement No. 14) Order 2008 (S.I. 2008/2545)
- Bradford & Bingley plc Transfer of Securities and Property etc. Order 2008 (S.I. 2008/2546)
- Value Added Tax (Finance) (No. 2) Order 2008 (S.I. 2008/2547)
- Child Maintenance and Other Payments Act 2008 (Commencement No. 3 and Transitional and Savings Provisions) Order 2008 (S.I. 2008/2548)
- Pollution Prevention and Control (Designation of Directives) (England and Wales) Order 2008 (S.I. 2008/2549)
- Consumers, Estate Agents and Redress Act 2007 (Commencement No. 5 and Savings and Transitional Provisions) Order 2008 (S.I. 2008/2550)
- Child Support Information Regulations 2008 (S.I. 2008/2551)
- National Health Service (General Ophthalmic Services) and (Optical Charges and Payments) (Amendment) (Wales) Regulations 2008 (S.I. 2008/2552)
- Nursing and Midwifery Council (Constitution) Order 2008 (S.I. 2008/2553)
- General Medical Council (Constitution) Order 2008 (S.I. 2008/2554)
- Health Care and Associated Professions (Miscellaneous Amendments) Order 2008 (Commencement No. 1) Order of Council 2008 (S.I. 2008/2556)
- Digital Switchover (Disclosure of Information) Act 2007 (Prescription of Information) (Amendment) Order 2008 (S.I. 2008/2557)
- National Information Governance Board Regulations 2008 (S.I. 2008/2558)
- Mental Health (Hospital, Guardianship and Treatment) (England) (Amendment) Regulations 2008 (S.I. 2008/2560)
- Mental Health Act 2007 (Commencement No. 8 and Transitional Provisions) Order 2008 (S.I. 2008/2561)
- Air Navigation (Jersey) Order 2008 (S.I. 2008/2562)
- Inspectors of Education, Children's Services and Skills (No. 4) Order 2008 (S.I. 2008/2563)
- European Communities (Designation) (No. 3) Order 2008 (S.I. 2008/2564)
- Cosmetic Products (Safety) (Amendment No. 2) Regulations 2008 (S.I. 2008/2566)
- Civil Enforcement of Parking Contraventions (The County Council of Durham) (Durham District) Designation Order 2008 (S.I. 2008/2567)
- National Health Service (Travelling Expenses and Remission of Charges) (Wales) (Amendment)(No.2) Regulations 2008 (S.I. 2008/2568)
- Social Fund Cold Weather Payments (General) Amendment Regulations 2008 (S.I. 2008/2569)
- Pesticides (Maximum Residue Levels) (England and Wales) Regulations 2008 (S.I. 2008/2570)
- National Health Service (Charges for Drugs and Appliances) Amendment Regulations 2008 (S.I. 2008/2593)
- Constitutional Reform Act 2005 (Commencement No. 10) Order 2008 (S.I. 2008/2597)
- Genetically Modified Organisms (England) (Amendments) Regulations 2008 (S.I. 2008/2598)
- Hydrocarbon Oil and Bioblend (Private Pleasure-flying and Private Pleasure Craft) (Payment of Rebate etc.) Regulations 2008 (S.I. 2008/2599)
- Hydrocarbon Oil (Supply of Rebated Heavy Oil) (Payment of Rebate) Regulations 2008 (S.I. 2008/2600)

== 2601–2700 ==
- The Income Tax (Pay As You Earn) (Amendment) (No.2) Regulations 2008 (S.I. 2008/2601)
- The Taxation of Benefits under Government Pilot Schemes (Better off in Work Credit) Order 2008 (S.I. 2008/2603)
- The Insurance Companies (Overseas Life Assurance Business) (Excluded Business) (Amendment) Regulations 2008 (S.I. 2008/2625)
- The Overseas Insurers (Tax Representatives) (Amendment) Regulations 2008 (S.I. 2008/2626)
- The Insurance Companies (Overseas Life Assurance Business) (Compliance) (Amendment) Regulations 2008 (S.I. 2008/2627)
- The Life Assurance and Other Policies (Keeping of Information and Duties of Insurers) (Amendment) Regulations 2008 (S.I. 2008/2628)
- The Police and Criminal Evidence Act 1984 (Codes of Practice) (Revisions to Code A) Order 2008 (S.I. 2008/2638)
- The Statutory Auditors and Third Country Auditors (Amendment) (No. 2) Regulations 2008 (S.I. 2008/2639)
- The Non-resident Companies (General Insurance Business) (Amendment) Regulations 2008 (S.I. 2008/2643)
- The Enterprise Act 2002 (Specification of Additional Section 58 Consideration) Order 2008 (S.I. 2008/2645)
- The Group Relief for Overseas Losses (Modification of the Corporation Tax Acts for Non-resident Insurance Companies) Regulations 2008 (S.I. 2008/2646)
- The European Single Currency (Taxes) (Amendment) Regulations 2008 (S.I. 2008/2647)
- The Veterinary Medicines (Amendment) Regulations 2008 (S.I. 2008/2648)
- The Corporation Tax (Instalment Payments) (Amendment) Regulations 2008 (S.I. 2008/2649)
- The Child Support (Consequential Provisions) (No. 2) Regulations 2008 (S.I. 2008/2656)
- The Special Educational Needs (Information) Act 2008 (Commencement) Order 2008 (S.I. 2008/2664)
- The Social Security (Miscellaneous Amendments) (No. 5) Regulations 2008 (S.I. 2008/2667)
- Landsbanki Freezing Order 2008 (S.I. 2008/2668)
- The Landfill Tax (Material from Contaminated Land) (Phasing out of Exemption) Order 2008 (S.I. 2008/2669)
- The Insurance Companies (Taxation of Reinsurance Business) (Amendment) (No. 2) Regulations 2008 (S.I. 2008/2670)
- The Financial Services and Markets Act 2000 (Consequential Amendments) (Taxes) Order 2008 (S.I. 2008/2673)
- The Child Maintenance and Other Payments Act 2008 (Commencement No. 4 and Transitional Provision) Order 2008 (S.I. 2008/2675)
- The Value Added Tax (Reduced Rate) (Supplies of Domestic Fuel or Power) Order 2008 (S.I. 2008/2676)
- The National Health Service (Directions by Strategic Health Authorities to Primary Care Trusts Regarding Arrangements for Involvement) (No.2) Regulations 2008 (S.I. 2008/2677)
- The National Insurance Contributions (Application of Part 7 of the Finance Act 2004) (Amendment) Regulations 2008 (S.I. 2008/2678)
- The Insurance Companies (Reserves) (Tax) (Amendment) Regulations 2008 (S.I. 2008/2679)
- The Legal Services Act 2007 (Prescribed Charity) Order 2008 (S.I. 2008/2680)
- The Double Taxation Relief (Surrender of Relievable Tax Within a Group) (Amendment) Regulations 2008 (S.I. 2008/2681)
- The Income Tax (Deposit-takers and Building Societies) (Interest Payments) Regulations 2008 (S.I. 2008/2682)
- The Tribunals, Courts and Enforcement Act 2007 (Transitional and Consequential Provisions) Order 2008 (S.I. 2008/2683)
- The First-tier Tribunal and Upper Tribunal (Chambers) Order 2008 (S.I. 2008/2684)
- The Tribunal Procedure (First-tier Tribunal) (Social Entitlement Chamber) Rules 2008 (S.I. 2008/2685)
- The Tribunal Procedure (First-tier Tribunal) (War Pensions and Armed Forces Compensation Chamber) Rules 2008 (S.I. 2008/2686)
- The Income Tax (Interest Payments) (Information Powers) (Amendment) Regulations 2008 (S.I. 2008/2688)
- The General Optical Council (Fitness to Practise) (Amendment in Relation to Standard of Proof) Rules Order of Council 2008 (S.I. 2008/2690)
- The Qualifications for Appointment of Members to the First-tier Tribunal and Upper Tribunal Order 2008 (S.I. 2008/2692)
- The Amusement Machine Licence Duty, etc. (Amendments) Regulations 2008 (S.I. 2008/2693)
- The Sustainable Communities Regulations 2008 (S.I. 2008/2694)
- The Tribunals, Courts and Enforcement Act 2007 (Commencement No. 6 and Transitional Provisions) Order 2008 (S.I. 2008/2696)
- The Tribunals, Courts and Enforcement Act 2007 (Transitional Judicial Pensions Provisions) Regulations 2008 (S.I. 2008/2697)
- The Tribunal Procedure (Upper Tribunal) Rules 2008 (S.I. 2008/2698)
- The Tribunal Procedure (First-tier Tribunal) (Health, Education and Social Care Chamber) Rules 2008 (S.I. 2008/2699)
- The Discipline of Judges (Designation) Order 2008 (S.I. 2008/2700)

== 2701–2800 ==
- The Economic Regulation of Airports (Designation) Order (Amendment) Order 2008 (S.I. 2008/2702)
- The Community Legal Service (Financial) (Amendment No. 2) Regulations 2008 (S.I. 2008/2703)
- The Community Legal Service (Funding) (Amendment No. 2) Order 2008 (S.I. 2008/2704)
- The Mental Health Review Tribunal for Wales Rules 2008 (S.I. 2008/2705)
- The Mesothelioma Lump Sum Payments (Claims and Reconsiderations) (Amendment) Regulations 2008 (S.I. 2008/2706)
- The Appeals (Excluded Decisions) Order 2008 (S.I. 2008/2707)
- The Agricultural Holdings (Units of Production) (England) Order 2008 (S.I. 2008/2708)
- The Criminal Justice and Immigration Act 2008 (Commencement No. 3 and Transitional Provisions) Order 2008 (S.I. 2008/2712)
- The Bail (Electronic Monitoring of Requirements) (Responsible Officer) Order 2008 (S.I. 2008/2713)
- The Health Act 2006 (Commencement No. 6) Order 2008 (S.I. 2008/2714)
- The Education (Student Loans) (Repayment) (Amendment) (No. 2) Regulations 2008 (S.I. 2008/2715)
- The Health and Social Care Act 2008 (Commencement No. 3) Order 2008 (S.I. 2008/2717)
- The Plant Health (England) (Amendment) (No. 2) Order 2008 (S.I. 2008/2765)
- The Landsbanki Freezing (Amendment) Order 2008 (S.I. 2008/2766)
- The Social Security (Miscellaneous Amendments) (No.6) Regulations 2008 (S.I. 2008/2767)
- The Criminal Justice (Sentencing) (Curfew Condition) Order 2008 (S.I. 2008/2768)
- The NHS Direct National Health Service Trust (Establishment) Amendment Order 2008 (S.I. 2008/2769)
- The Employment Tribunals (Constitution and Rules of Procedure) (Amendment) Regulations 2008 (S.I. 2008/2771)
- The Welfare Reform Act 2007 (Commencement No. 8) Order 2008 (S.I. 2008/2772)
- The Eccles College and Salford College (Dissolution) Order 2008 (S.I. 2008/2773)
- The Protection of Wrecks (Designation) (England) Order 2008 (S.I. 2008/2775)
- The Fixed-term Employees (Prevention of Less Favourable Treatment) (Amendment) Regulations 2008 (S.I. 2008/2776)
- The Stamp Duty and Stamp Duty Reserve Tax (Investment Exchanges and Clearing Houses) Regulations 2008 (S.I. 2008/2777)
- The Forced Marriage (Civil Protection) Act 2007 (Commencement No.1) Order 2008 (S.I. 2008/2779)
- The Appeals (Excluded Decisions) (Amendment) Order 2008 (S.I. 2008/2780)
- The Employment and Support Allowance (Transitional Provisions) (Amendment) Regulations 2008 (S.I. 2008/2783)
- The South Devon Healthcare NHS Foundation Trust (Transfer of Trust Property) Order 2008 (S.I. 2008/2784)
- The Police and Justice Act 2006 (Commencement No. 10) Order 2008 (S.I. 2008/2785)
- The Bradford District Care Trust (Transfer of Trust Property) Order 2008 (S.I. 2008/2786)
- The Local Authorities (Functions and Responsibilities) (England) (Amendment No. 3) Regulations 2008 (S.I. 2008/2787)
- The Mental Health Act 2007 (Commencement No.9) Order 2008 (S.I. 2008/2788)
- The Medicines (Pharmacies) (Responsible Pharmacist) Regulations 2008 (S.I. 2008/2789)
- The Immigration and Nationality (Cost Recovery Fees) (Amendment No. 3) Regulations 2008 (S.I. 2008/2790)
- The Contracting Out (Administrative and Other Court Staff) (Amendment) Order 2008 (S.I. 2008/2791)
- The Appointments Commission (Amendment) Regulations 2008 (S.I. 2008/2792)
- The Remand on Bail (Disapplication of Credit Period) Rules 2008 (S.I. 2008/2793)
- The 3400–3800 MHz Frequency Band (Management) Regulations 2008 (S.I. 2008/2794)
- The Cat and Dog Fur (Control of Import, Export and Placing on the Market) Regulations 2008 (S.I. 2008/2795)

== 2801–2900 ==
- The A27 Trunk Road (Southerham to Beddingham Improvement) (Derestriction and Revocation) Order 2008 (S.I. 2008/2820)
- The A27 Trunk Road (Southerham to Beddingham Improvement) (Banned Turns) Order 2008 (S.I. 2008/2821)
- The UK Borders Act 2007 (Commencement No. 4) Order 2008 (S.I. 2008/2822)
- The Housing Benefit and Council Tax Benefit (Amendment) (No. 2) Regulations 2008 (S.I. 2008/2824)
- The Legislative Reform (Consumer Credit) Order 2008 (S.I. 2008/2826)
- The Mental Health Act 2007 (Consequential Amendments) Order 2008 (S.I. 2008/2828)
- The Gambling Act 2005 (Advertising of Foreign Gambling) (Amendment) (No.2) Regulations 2008 (S.I. 2008/2829)
- The Immigration (Biometric Registration) (Objection to Civil Penalty) Order 2008 (S.I. 2008/2830)
- The Housing and Regeneration Act 2008 (Consequential Provisions) (No. 2) Order 2008 (S.I. 2008/2831)
- The Excise Warehousing (Etc.) (Amendment) Regulations 2008 (S.I. 2008/2832)
- The Transfer of Tribunal Functions Order 2008 (S.I. 2008/2833)
- The Appeals from the Upper Tribunal to the Court of Appeal Order 2008 (S.I. 2008/2834)
- The First-tier Tribunal and Upper Tribunal (Composition of Tribunal) Order 2008 (S.I. 2008/2835)
- The Allocation and Transfer of Proceedings Order 2008 (S.I. 2008/2836)
- The Transfer of Housing Corporation Functions (Modifications and Transitional Provisions) Order 2008 (S.I. 2008/2839)
- The Legislative Reform (Local Authority Consent Requirements) (England and Wales) Order 2008 (S.I. 2008/2840)
- The Cremation (England and Wales) Regulations 2008 (S.I. 2008/2841)
- The Motor Vehicles (EC Type Approval) (Amendment) Regulations 2008 (S.I. 2008/2844)
- The Falkland Islands Constitution Order 2008 (S.I. 2008/2846)
- The Statistics of Trade (Customs and Excise) (Amendment) (No. 2) Regulations 2008 (S.I. 2008/2847)
- The Public Contracts and Utilities Contracts (Postal Services Amendments) Regulations 2008 (S.I. 2008/2848)
- The Road Vehicles (Registration and Licensing) (Amendment No. 3) Regulations 2008 (S.I. 2008/2849)
- The Retention of Registration Marks (Amendment) Regulations 2008 (S.I. 2008/2850)
- The Merchant Shipping (Training and Certification) (Amendment) Regulations 2008 (S.I. 2008/2851)
- The REACH Enforcement Regulations 2008 (S.I. 2008/2852)
- The Civil Proceedings Fees (Amendment) Order 2008 (S.I. 2008/2853)
- The Non-Contentious Probate Fees (Amendment) Order 2008 (S.I. 2008/2854)
- The Magistrates’ Courts Fees (Amendment) Order 2008 (S.I. 2008/2855)
- The Family Proceedings Fees (Amendment) Order 2008 (S.I. 2008/2856)
- The Local Elections (Ordinary Day of Elections in 2009) Order 2008 (S.I. 2008/2857)
- The Family Proceedings Courts (Children Act 1989) (Amendment) Rules 2008 (S.I. 2008/2858)
- The Magistrates’ Courts (Enforcement of Children Act 1989 Contact Orders) Rules 2008 (S.I. 2008/2859)
- The Companies Act 2006 (Commencement No. 8, Transitional Provisions and Savings) Order 2008 (S.I. 2008/2860)
- The Family Proceedings (Amendment) (No.2) Rules 2008 (S.I. 2008/2861)
- The Police (Performance) Regulations 2008 (S.I. 2008/2862)
- The Police Appeals Tribunals Rules 2008 (S.I. 2008/2863)
- The Police (Conduct) Regulations 2008 (S.I. 2008/2864)
- The Police (Amendment) Regulations 2008 (S.I. 2008/2865)
- The Police (Complaints and Misconduct) (Amendment) Regulations 2008 (S.I. 2008/2866)
- The Local Government (Structural Changes) (Transitional Arrangements) (No.2) Regulations 2008 (S.I. 2008/2867)
- The National Health Service (Travel Expenses and Remission of Charges) Amendment (No. 2) Regulations 2008 (S.I. 2008/2868)
- The Political Donations and Regulated Transactions (Anonymous Electors) Regulations 2008 (S.I. 2008/2869)
- The Children and Adoption Act 2006 (Commencement No. 3) Order 2008 (S.I. 2008/2870)
- The Recovery of Taxes etc. Due in Other Member States (Amendment of Section 134 of the Finance Act 2002) Regulations 2008 (S.I. 2008/2871)
- The Land Registration Act 2002 (Amendment) Order 2008 (S.I. 2008/2872)
- The Education (Listed Bodies) (England) (Amendment) Order 2008 (S.I. 2008/2888)
- The Education (Recognised Bodies) (England) (Amendment) Order 2008 (S.I. 2008/2889)

== 2901–3000 ==
- The Crossrail (Planning Appeals) (Written Representations Procedure) (England) Regulations 2008 (S.I. 2008/2908)
- The Local Authorities (England) (Charges for Property Searches) (Disapplication) Order 2008 (S.I. 2008/2909)
- The Merchant Shipping (Prevention of Air Pollution from Ships) Regulations 2008 (S.I. 2008/2924)
- The Council for Healthcare Regulatory Excellence (Appointment, Procedure etc.) Regulations 2008 (S.I. 2008/2927)
- The Social Security (Incapacity Benefit Work-focused Interviews) Regulations 2008 (S.I. 2008/2928)
- The Criminal Defence Service (Funding) (Amendment No. 2) Order 2008 (S.I. 2008/2930)
- The Wool Textile Industry (Export Promotion Levy) (Revocation) Order 2008 (S.I. 2008/2932)
- The Veterinary Surgeons and Veterinary Practitioners (Registration) (Amendment) Regulations Order of Council 2008 (S.I. 2008/2933)
- The High Court and County Courts Jurisdiction (Amendment) Order 2008 (S.I. 2008/2934)
- The Medical Devices (Amendment) Regulations 2008 (S.I. 2008/2936)
- The Case Tribunals (England) Regulations 2008 (S.I. 2008/2938)
- The Education (Student Support) (Amendment) (No. 3) Regulations 2008 (S.I. 2008/2939)
- The Children Act 1989 (Contact Activity Directions and Conditions: Financial Assistance) (England) Regulations 2008 (S.I. 2008/2940)
- The Armed Forces and Reserve Forces (Compensation Scheme) (Amendment No. 3) Order 2008 (S.I. 2008/2942)
- The Education (Special Educational Needs Co-ordinators) (England) Regulations 2008 (S.I. 2008/2945)
- The Medicines (Pharmacies) (Applications for Registration and Fees) Amendment Regulations 2008 (S.I. 2008/2946)
- The Judicial Pensions and Retirement Act 1993 (Addition of Qualifying Judicial Offices) (No.2) Order 2008 (S.I. 2008/2947)
- The Rail Vehicle Accessibility (London Underground Victoria Line 09TS Vehicles) Exemption Order 2008 (S.I. 2008/2969)
- The Rail Vehicle Accessibility Exemption Orders (Parliamentary Procedures) Regulations 2008 (S.I. 2008/2975)
- The Law Applicable to Non-Contractual Obligations (England and Wales and Northern Ireland) Regulations 2008 (S.I. 2008/2986)
- The Housing Benefit and Council Tax Benefit (Amendment) (No. 3) Regulations 2008 (S.I. 2008/2987)
- The Council of the City of Wakefield (Wakefield Waterfront Hepworth Gallery Footbridge) Scheme 2008 Confirmation Instrument 200 (S.I. 2008/2988)
- The Local Government Pension Scheme (Amendment) (No. 2) Regulations 2008 (S.I. 2008/2989)
- The Taxation of Pension Schemes (Transitional Provisions) (Amendment) Order 2008 (S.I. 2008/2990)
- The Taxes (Fees for Payment by Internet) Regulations 2008 (S.I. 2008/2991)
- The Rodbaston College, Cannock Chase Technical College and Tamworth and Lichfield College (Dissolution) Order 2008 (S.I. 2008/2992)
- The Criminal Justice and Immigration Act 2008 (Commencement No. 4 and Saving Provision) Order 2008 (S.I. 2008/2993)
- The Health and Social Care Act 2008 (Commencement No. 4) Order 2008 (S.I. 2008/2994)
- The Judicial Appointments Order 2008 (S.I. 2008/2995)
- The Companies (Particulars of Company Charges) Regulations 2008 (S.I. 2008/2996)
- The Pre-release Access to Official Statistics Order 2008 (S.I. 2008/2998)
- The Charges for Residues Surveillance (Amendment) Regulations 2008 (S.I. 2008/2999)
- The Companies Act 2006 (Annual Return and Service Addresses) Regulations 2008 (S.I. 2008/3000)

== 3001–3100 ==
- The Legislative Reform (Lloyd's) Order 2008 (S.I. 2008/3001)
- The Housing and Regeneration Act 2008 (Consequential Provisions) Order 2008 (S.I. 2008/3002)
- The Local Loans (Increase of Limit) Order 2008 (S.I. 2008/3004)
- The Companies (Company Records) Regulations 2008 (S.I. 2008/3006)
- The Companies (Fees for Inspection of Company Records) Regulations 2008 (S.I. 2008/3007)
- The Race Relations Act 1976 (Amendment) Regulations 2008 (S.I. 2008/3008)
- The Crime (International Co-operation) Act 2003 (Commencement No. 4) Order 2008 (S.I. 2008/3009)
- The Mutual Recognition of Driving Disqualifications (Great Britain and Ireland) Regulations 2008 (S.I. 2008/3010)
- The Offshore Installations (Safety Zones) (No. 4) Order 2008 (S.I. 2008/3011)
- The Civil Contingencies Act 2004 (Amendment of List of Responders) Order 2008 (S.I. 2008/3012)
- The Removal, Storage and Disposal of Vehicles (Prescribed Sums and Charges) (Amendment) (England) Regulations 2008 (S.I. 2008/3013)
- The Companies (Registration) Regulations 2008 (S.I. 2008/3014)
- The Allocation of Housing (England)(Amendment)(Family Intervention Tenancies) Regulations 2008 (S.I. 2008/3015)
- The North Yorkshire County Council (School Meals) Order 2008 (S.I. 2008/3016)
- The Immigration and Nationality (Fees) (Amendment No. 3) Regulations 2008 (S.I. 2008/3017)
- The Excise Duties (Surcharges or Rebates) (Hydrocarbon Oils etc.) (Revocation) Order 2008 (S.I. 2008/3018)
- The Excise Duties (Road Fuel Gas) (Reliefs) (Revocation) Regulations 2008 (S.I. 2008/3019)
- The Value Added Tax (Change of Rate) Order 2008 (S.I. 2008/3020)
- The Value Added Tax (Amendment) (No 2) Regulations 2008 (S.I. 2008/3021)
- The Local Government (Structural Changes) (Finance) Regulations 2008 (S.I. 2008/3022)
- The Income Tax (Indexation) (No. 3) Order 2008 (S.I. 2008/3023)
- The Income Tax (Indexation) (No. 4) Order 2008 (S.I. 2008/3024)
- The Individual Savings Account (Amendment No. 3) Regulations 2008 (S.I. 2008/3025)
- The Alcoholic Liquor Duties (Surcharges) and Tobacco Products Duty Order 2008 (S.I. 2008/3026)
- The Electricity (Exemption from the Requirement for a Generation Licence) (Little Cheyne Court) (England and Wales) Order 2008 (S.I. 2008/3045)
- The Electricity (Exemption from the Requirement for a Generation Licence) (Gunfleet Sands II) (England and Wales) Order 2008 (S.I. 2008/3046)
- The General Chiropractic Council (Constitution) Order 2008 (S.I. 2008/3047)
- The Immigration (Biometric Registration) Regulations 2008 (S.I. 2008/3048)
- The Immigration (Biometric Registration) (Civil Penalty Code of Practice) Order 2008 (S.I. 2008/3049)
- The Safeguarding Vulnerable Groups Act 2006 (Prescribed Criteria) (Foreign Offences) Order 2008 (S.I. 2008/3050)
- The Social Security (Lone Parents and Miscellaneous Amendments) Regulations 2008 (S.I. 2008/3051)
- The Immigration (Designation of Travel Bans) (Amendment) Order 2008 (S.I. 2008/3052)
- The Definition of Financial Instrument Order 2008 (S.I. 2008/3053)
- The Education (Student Support) (European Institutions) (Amendment) (No. 2) Regulations 2008 (S.I. 2008/3054)
- The Employment Rights (Increase of Limits) Order 2008 (S.I. 2008/3055)
- The Travellers’ Allowances (Amendment) Order 2008 (S.I. 2008/3058)
- The Alcoholic Liquor (Surcharge on Spirits Duty) Order 2008 (S.I. 2008/3062)
- The Export Control (Iran) (Amendment) Order 2008 (S.I. 2008/3063)
- The Christmas Bonus (Relevant Week) Order 2008 (S.I. 2008/3064)
- The Domestic Violence, Crime and Victims Act 2004 (Commencement No. 10) Order 2008 (S.I. 2008/3065)
- The Antarctic (Amendment) Regulations 2008 (S.I. 2008/3066)
- The Human Tissue Act 2004 (Ethical Approval, Exceptions from Licensing and Supply of Information about Transplants) (Amendment) Regulations 2008(S.I. 2008/3067)
- The Housing and Regeneration Act 2008 (Commencement No. 2 and Transitional, Saving and Transitory Provisions) Order 2008 (S.I. 2008/3068)
- The Financial Assistance Scheme (Amendment) Regulations 2008 (S.I. 2008/3069)
- The Occupational Pensions (Revaluation) Order 2008 (S.I. 2008/3070)
- The Childcare (Provision of Information About Young Children) (England) (Amendment) Regulations 2008 (S.I. 2008/3071)
- The Education (Information About Individual Pupils) (England) (Amendment) Regulations 2008 (S.I. 2008/3072)
- The Takeover Code (Concert Parties) Regulations 2008 (S.I. 2008/3073)
- The Legal Services Act 2007 (Functions of a Designated Regulator) Order 2008 (S.I. 2008/3074)
- The Channel Tunnel Rail Link (Nomination) Order 2008 (S.I. 2008/3076)
- The Education and Skills Act 2008 (Commencement No. 1 and Savings) Order 2008 (S.I. 2008/3077)
- The Non-Domestic Rating Contributions (England) (Amendment) Regulations 2008 (S.I. 2008/3078)
- The National Child Measurement Programme Regulations 2008 (S.I. 2008/3080)
- The Education (National Curriculum) (Key Stage 3 Assessment Arrangements) (England) (Amendment) Order 2008 (S.I. 2008/3081)
- The Leeds City College (Incorporation) Order 2008 (S.I. 2008/3083)
- The Leeds City College (Government) Regulations 2008 (S.I. 2008/3084)
- The Civil Procedure (Amendment No.2) Rules 2008 (S.I. 2008/3085)
- The Education (School and Local Education Authority Performance Targets) (England) (Amendment) Regulations 2008 (S.I. 2008/3086)
- The Transfrontier Shipment of Radioactive Waste and Spent Fuel Regulations 2008 (S.I. 2008/3087)
- The School Admissions (Admission Arrangements) (England) Regulations 2008 (S.I. 2008/3089)
- The School Admissions (Co-ordination of Admission Arrangements) (England) Regulations 2008 (S.I. 2008/3090)
- The School Admissions (Local Authority Reports and Admission Forums) (England) Regulations 2008 (S.I. 2008/3091)
- The Education (Admissions Appeals Arrangements)(England)(Amendment) Regulations 2008 (S.I. 2008/3092)
- The School Information (England) Regulations 2008 (S.I. 2008/3093)
- The Parish Councils (Power to Promote Well-being) (Prescribed Conditions) Order 2008 (S.I. 2008/3095)
- The Insurance Companies (Corporation Tax Acts) (Amendment) (No. 2) Order 2008 (S.I. 2008/3096)
- The Medicines for Human Use (Marketing Authorisations Etc.) Amendment Regulations 2008 (S.I. 2008/3097)
- The National Savings Bank (Amendment) (No. 4) Regulations 2008 (S.I. 2008/3098)
- The Social Security (Contributions) (Amendment No.6) Regulations 2008 (S.I. 2008/3099)

== 3101–3200 ==
- The European Parliamentary Elections (Appointed Day of Poll) Order 2008 (S.I. 2008/3102)
- The Parks for People (England) Joint Scheme (Authorisation) Order 2008 (S.I. 2008/3103)
- The Housing Renewal Grants (Amendment) (No. 2) (England) Regulations 2008 (S.I. 2008/3104)
- The Gambling (Operating Licence and Single-Machine Permit Fees) (Amendment) (No 2) Regulations 2008 (S.I. 2008/3105)
- The Family Proceedings Fees (Amendment No. 2) Order 2008 (S.I. 2008/3106)
- The Home Information Pack (Amendment) (No.3) Regulations 2008 (S.I. 2008/3107)
- The Health in Pregnancy Grant (Entitlement and Amount) Regulations 2008 (S.I. 2008/3108)
- The Health in Pregnancy Grant (Administration) Regulations 2008 (S.I. 2008/3109)
- The Local Government and Public Involvement in Health Act 2007 (Commencement No. 8) Order 2008 (S.I. 2008/3110)
- The Family Intervention Tenancies (Review of Local Authority Decisions) (England) Regulations 2008 (S.I. 2008/3111)
- The Local Authorities (Elected Mayors) (England) Regulations 2008 (S.I. 2008/3112)
- The General Optical Council (Committee Constitution) (Amendment) Rules Order of Council 2008 (S.I. 2008/3113)
- The Parliamentary Commissioner Order 2008 (S.I. 2008/3115)
- The European Communities (Definition of Treaties) (2006 International Tropical Timber Agreement) Order 2008 (S.I. 2008/3116)
- The European Communities (Designation) (No. 4) Order 2008 (S.I. 2008/3117)
- The Education (Inspectors of Education and Training in Wales) Order 2008 (S.I. 2008/3118)
- The Civil Aviation (Overseas Territories) (Gibraltar) (Revocations) Order 2008 (S.I. 2008/3119)
- The Civil Aviation (Overseas Territories) (Gibraltar) (Revocations) (No. 2) Order 2008 (S.I. 2008/3120)
- The Air Navigation (Guernsey) (Revocation) Order 2008 (S.I. 2008/3121)
- The Companies Act 2006 (Extension of Takeover Panel Provisions) (Isle of Man) Order 2008 (S.I. 2008/3122)
- The United Nations Arms Embargoes (Dependent Territories) (Amendment) Order 2008 (S.I. 2008/3123)
- The International Organization for Migration (Immunities and Privileges) Order 2008 (S.I. 2008/3124)
- The Air Navigation (Overseas Territories) (Amendment) Order 2008 (S.I. 2008/3125)
- The Inspectors of Education, Children's Services and Skills (No. 5) Order 2008 (S.I. 2008/3126)
- The Cayman Islands (Constitution) (Amendment) Order 2008 (S.I. 2008/3127)
- The United Nations Arms Embargoes (Rwanda) (Amendment) Order 2008 (S.I. 2008/3128)
- The Naval Medical Compassionate Fund Order 2008 (S.I. 2008/3129)
- The Misuse of Drugs Act 1971 (Amendment) Order 2008 (S.I. 2008/3130)
- The Medical Profession (Miscellaneous Amendments) Order 2008 (S.I. 2008/3131)
- The National Assembly for Wales (Legislative Competence) (Social Welfare and Other Fields) Order 2008 (S.I. 2008/3132)
- The Air Navigation (Environmental Standards For Non-EASA Aircraft) Order 2008 (S.I. 2008/3133)
- The Transfer of Functions (Administration of Rent Officer Service in England) Order 2008 (S.I. 2008/3134)
- The International Criminal Court (Remand Time) Order 2008 (S.I. 2008/3135)
- The UK Borders Act 2007 (Commencement No. 5) Order 2008 (S.I. 2008/3136)
- The Health and Social Care Act 2008 (Commencement No. 5) Order 2008 (S.I. 2008/3137)
- The Judicial Pensions and Retirement Act 1993 (Addition of Qualifying Judicial Offices) (No. 3) Order 2008 (S.I. 2008/3139)
- The Social Security (Child Benefit Disregard) Regulations 2008 (S.I. 2008/3140)
- The Merchant Shipping (Vessel Traffic Monitoring and Reporting Requirements) (Amendment) Regulations 2008 (S.I. 2008/3145)
- The Police and Criminal Evidence Act 1984 (Codes of Practice) (Revisions to Code A) (No. 2) Order 2008 (S.I. 2008/3146)
- The Designation of Schools having a Religious Character (England) (No. 2) Order 2008 (S.I. 2008/3147)
- The Nursing and Midwifery Council (Midwifery and Practice Committees) (Constitution) Rules Order of Council 2008 (S.I. 2008/3148)
- The Legal Services Act 2007 (Commencement No. 3 and Transitory Provisions) Order 2008 (S.I. 2008/3149)
- The Health Care and Associated Professions (Miscellaneous Amendments) Order 2008 (Commencement No. 2) Order of Council 2008 (S.I. 2008/3150)
- The Tax Credits Act 2002 (Transitional Provisions) Order 2008 (S.I. 2008/3151)
- The Youth Justice Board for England and Wales (Amendment) Order 2008 (S.I. 2008/3155)
- The Rent Officers (Housing Benefit Functions) Amendment (No. 2) Order 2008 (S.I. 2008/3156)
- The Social Security (Miscellaneous Amendments) (No. 7) Regulations 2008 (S.I. 2008/3157)
- The UK Borders Act 2007 (Code of Practice on Children) Order 2008 (S.I. 2008/3158)
- The Authorised Investment Funds (Tax) (Amendment No. 3) Regulations 2008 (S.I. 2008/3159)
- The Civil Enforcement of Parking Contraventions (St. Helens) Designation Order 2008 (S.I. 2008/3160)
- The Export of Goods, Transfer of Technology and Provision of Technical Assistance (Control) (Amendment) (No. 2) Order 2008 (S.I. 2008/3161)
- The Intestate Succession (Interest and Capitalisation) (Amendment) Order 2008 (S.I. 2008/3162)
- The Network Rail (Thameslink) (Land Acquisition) Order 2008 (S.I. 2008/3163)
- The Road Safety Act 2006 (Commencement No. 5) Order 2008 (S.I. 2008/3164)
- The Finance Act 2008, Section 31 (Specified Tax Year) Order 2008 (S.I. 2008/3165)
- The Mental Health Act 1983 (Independent Mental Health Advocates) (England) Regulations 2008 (S.I. 2008/3166)
- The Welfare Reform Act 2007 (Commencement No. 9) Order 2008 (S.I. 2008/3167)
- The Health and Social Care Act 2008 (Commencement No.6, Transitory and Transitional Provisions) Order 2008 (S.I. 2008/3168)
- The Air Navigation (Restriction of Flying) (Nuclear Installations) (Amendment) Regulations 2008 (S.I. 2008/3169)
- The Wireless Telegraphy (Licence Award) (Cardiff) Regulations 2008 (S.I. 2008/3190)
- The Wireless Telegraphy (Licence Award) (Manchester) Regulations 2008 (S.I. 2008/3191)
- The Wireless Telegraphy (Spectrum Trading) (Amendment) (No. 3) Regulations 2008 (S.I. 2008/3192)
- The Wireless Telegraphy (Register) (Amendment) (No. 3) Regulations 2008 (S.I. 2008/3193)
- The Social Security (Housing Costs Special Arrangements) (Amendment and Modification) Regulations 2008 (S.I. 2008/3195)
- The Zoonoses and Animal By-Products (Fees) (England) (No. 2) Regulations 2008 (S.I. 2008/3196)
- The Wireless Telegraphy (Limitation of Number of Spectrum Access Licences) (No. 2) Order 2008 (S.I. 2008/3197)
- The Civil Enforcement of Parking Contraventions (County of Cheshire) (City of Chester and Borough of Ellesmere Port & Neston) Designation Order 2008 (S.I. 2008/3198)
- The A65 Trunk Road (From M6 Junction 36 to the Roundabout Junction with the A59) (Detrunking) Order 2008 (S.I. 2008/3199)

== 3201–3300 ==
- The Land Registration (Proper Office) Order 2008 (S.I. 2008/3201)
- The Town and Country Planning (Trees) (Amendment No. 2) (England) Regulations 2008 (S.I. 2008/3202)
- The Animals and Animal Products (Import and Export) (England) (Amendment) Regulations 2008 (S.I. 2008/3203)
- The Safeguarding Vulnerable Groups Act 2006 (Commencement No. 1) (England) Order 2008 (S.I. 2008/3204)
- The Spirit Drinks Regulations 2008 (S.I. 2008/3206)
- Companies (Model Articles) Regulations 2008 (S.I. 2008/3229)
- The Products of Animal Origin (Third Country Imports) (England) (Amendment) Regulations 2008 (S.I. 2008/3230)
- The Export Control Order 2008 (S.I. 2008/3231)
- The Employment Act 2008 (Commencement No. 1, Transitional Provisions and Savings) Order 2008 (S.I. 2008/3232)
- The Plant Health (Import Inspection Fees) (England) (Amendment) Regulations 2008 (S.I. 2008/3233)
- The Taxes and Duties (Interest Rate) (Amendment) Regulations 2008 (S.I. 2008/3234)
- The Stamp Duty and Stamp Duty Reserve Tax (Investment Exchanges and Clearing Houses) Regulations (No. 2) 2008 (S.I. 2008/3235)
- The Stamp Duty Reserve Tax (Amendment of section 89AA of the Finance Act 1986) Regulations 2008 (S.I. 2008/3236)
- The Loan Relationships and Derivative Contracts (Change of Accounting Practice) (Amendment) Regulations 2008 (S.I. 2008/3237)
- The General Dental Council (Constitution) (Amendment) Order of Council 2008 (S.I. 2008/3238)
- The Employment Tribunals (Constitution and Rules of Procedure) (Amendment) Regulations 2008 (S.I. 2008/3240)
- The Pensions Act 2008 (Commencement No. 1 and Consequential Provision) Order 2008 (S.I. 2008/3241)
- The Fines Collection (Disclosure of Information) (Prescribed Benefits) Regulations 2008 (S.I. 2008/3242)
- The Financial Assistance for Environmental Purposes (England and Wales) Order 2008 (S.I. 2008/3243)
- The Health and Social Care Act 2008 (Commencement No. 7) Order 2008 (S.I. 2008/3244)
- The Local Government Pension Scheme (Administration) (Amendment) Regulations 2008 (S.I. 2008/3245)
- The Child Benefit (Rates) (Amendment) Regulations 2008 (S.I. 2008/3246)
- The Rates of Child Benefit (Commencement) Order 2008 (S.I. 2008/3247)
- The Local Authorities (England) (Charges for Property Searches) Regulations 2008 (S.I. 2008/3248)
- The Bradford &amp; Bingley plc Compensation Scheme Order 2008 (S.I. 2008/3249)
- The Kaupthing Singer &amp; Friedlander Limited (Determination of Compensation) Order 2008 (S.I. 2008/3250)
- The Heritable Bank plc (Determination of Compensation) Order 2008 (S.I. 2008/3251)
- The Beef and Veal Labelling Regulations 2008 (S.I. 2008/3252)
- The Education (Independent School Standards) (England) (Amendment) Regulations 2008 (S.I. 2008/3253)
- The Christmas Bonus (Specified Sum) Order 2008 (S.I. 2008/3255)
- The General Teaching Council for England (Disciplinary Functions) (Amendment) Regulations 2008 (S.I. 2008/3256)
- The Merchant Shipping (Prevention of Pollution by Sewage and Garbage from Ships) Regulations 2008 (S.I. 2008/3257)
- The Health Service Branded Medicines (Control of Prices and Supply of Information) (No. 2) Regulations 2008 (S.I. 2008/3258)
- The Rehabilitation of Offenders Act 1974 (Exceptions) (Amendment) (England and Wales) Order 2008 (S.I. 2008/3259)
- The Criminal Justice and Immigration Act 2008 (Commencement No. 5) Order 2008 (S.I. 2008/3260)
- The Overview and Scrutiny (Reference by Councillors) (Excluded Matters) (England) Order 2008 (S.I. 2008/3261)
- The Legislative Reform (Verification of Weighing and Measuring Equipment) Order 2008 (S.I. 2008/3262)
- The Severn Bridges Tolls Order 2008 (S.I. 2008/3263)
- The Council Tax and Non-Domestic Rating (Demand Notices) (England) (Amendment) (No. 2) Regulations 2008 (S.I. 2008/3264)
- The Safeguarding Vulnerable Groups Act 2006 (Prescribed Information) Regulations 2008 (S.I. 2008/3265)
- The Charities Act 2006 (Commencement No. 5, Transitional and Transitory Provisions and Savings) Order 2008 (S.I. 2008/3267)
- The Charities Act 1993 (Exception from Registration) Regulations 2008 (S.I. 2008/3268)
- The Criminal Procedure (Amendment No. 2) Rules 2008 (S.I. 2008/3269)
- The Employment and Support Allowance (Up-rating Modification) (Transitional) Regulations 2008 (S.I. 2008/3270)
- The A38 Trunk Road (Weeford, Staffordshire to Minworth, Birmingham) (Detrunking) Order 2008 (S.I. 2008/3291)
- The A38 Trunk Road (Langley Mill, Warwickshire/Birmingham) (Detrunking) Order 2008 (S.I. 2008/3292)
- The Armed Forces (Alignment of Service Discipline Acts) (No. 2) Order 2008 (S.I. 2008/3294)
- The Transmissible Spongiform Encephalopathies (England) (Amendment) Regulations 2008 (S.I. 2008/3295)
- The Counter-Terrorism Act 2008 (Commencement No. 1) Order 2008 (S.I. 2008/3296)
- The Penalties for Disorderly Behaviour (Amount of Penalty) (Amendment) Order 2008 (S.I. 2008/3297)
- The Kent County Council (Milton Creek Bridge) (No. 2) Scheme 2007 Confirmation Instrument 2008 (S.I. 2008/3298)

== 3301–3400 ==
- The Knowsley Metropolitan Borough Council (M62 Motorway, Junction 6 Improvements) Scheme 2008 Confirmation Instrument 2008 (S.I. 2008/3325)
- The Civil Procedure (Amendment No.3) Rules 2008 (S.I. 2008/3327)

== See also ==
- List of statutory instruments of the United Kingdom
