= Cranfield University =

British postgraduate public research university

- Coat of arms
- Former names: Cranfield Institute of Technology; College of Aeronautics
- Motto: Latin: Post Nubes Lux
- Motto in English: After clouds light
- Type: Public research university
- Established: 1946: College of Aeronautics; 1969: Cranfield Institute of Technology (gained degree awarding powers by royal charter); 1993: Cranfield University
- Academic affiliations: ACU; PEGASUS; Midlands Innovation; Universities UK; Defence Universities Alliance
- Chancellor: Baroness Brown of Cambridge
- Vice-Chancellor: Dame Karen Holford
- Students: 5,000 (2024/25)
- Undergraduates: 455 (2024/25)
- Postgraduates: 4,550 (2024/25)
- Location: Cranfield, Bedfordshire, England; Shrivenham, Oxfordshire, England; 52°04′24″N 00°37′40″W (Cranfield); 51°36′10.77″N 1°38′25.50″W (Shrivenham)
- Campus: Rural (both)
Colours
- Website: www.cranfield.ac.uk

Cranfield University is a postgraduate public research university in the United Kingdom that specialises in science, engineering, design, technology and management.

Cranfield was founded as the College of Aeronautics (CoA) in 1946. Through the 1950s and 1960s, the development of aircraft research led to growth and diversification into other areas such as manufacturing and management, and in 1967, to the founding of the Cranfield School of Management. In 1969, the College of Aeronautics was incorporated by royal charter as the Cranfield Institute of Technology and gained degree awarding powers. It adopted its current name in 1993.

Cranfield University has two campuses: the main campus is at Cranfield, Bedfordshire, and the second is at the Defence Academy of the United Kingdom at Shrivenham, southwest Oxfordshire. The main campus is unique in the United Kingdom (and Europe) for having its own airport – Cranfield Airport – and its own aircraft, used for teaching and research.

In May 2026, Cranfield University and King's College London announced that they intended to merge. This was confirmed with a signed agreement in November 2026, with Cranfield reverting to the name of Cranfield Institute of Technology and becoming a faculty of King's from August 2027.

== History ==
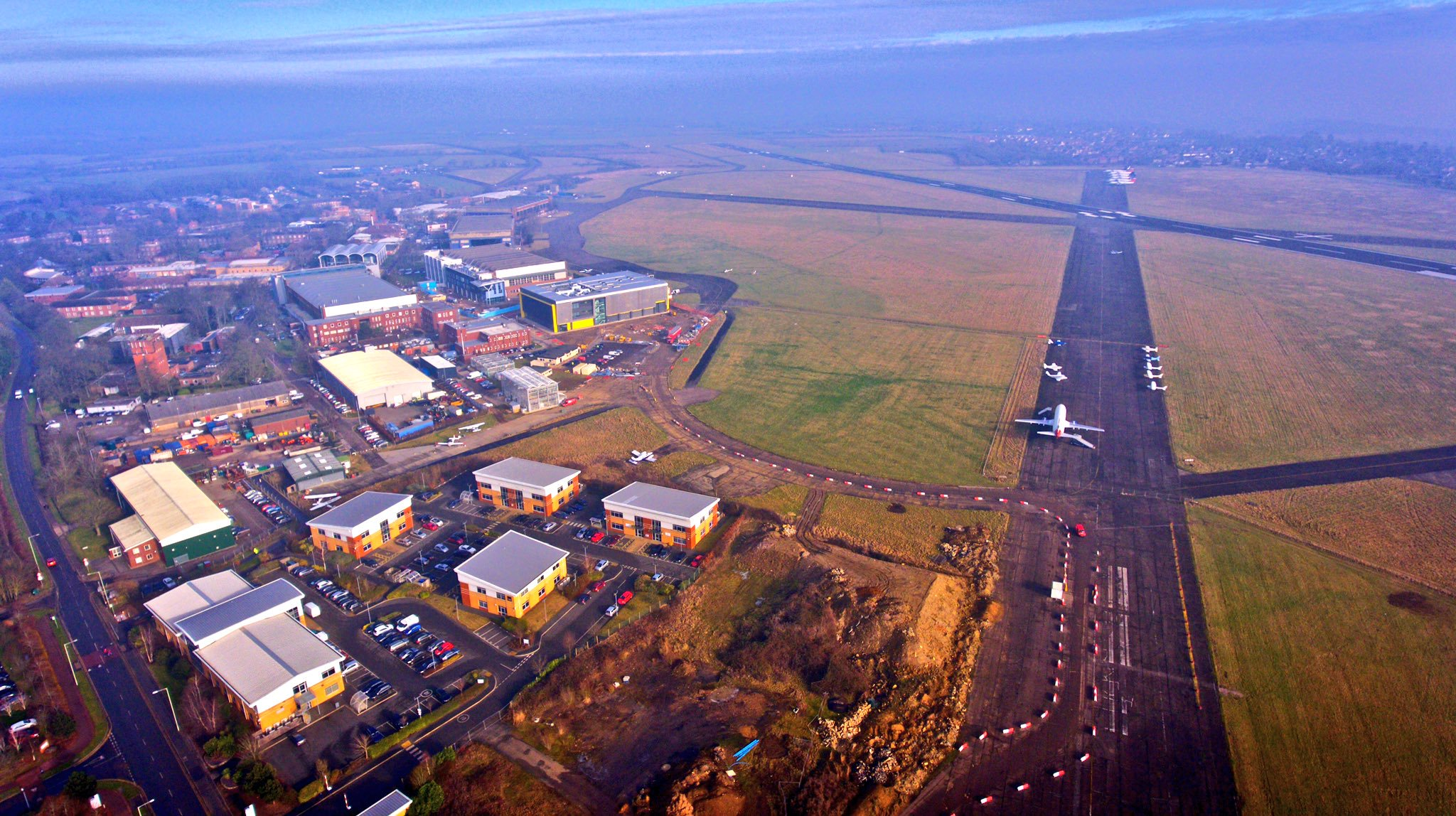
Cranfield University from the air

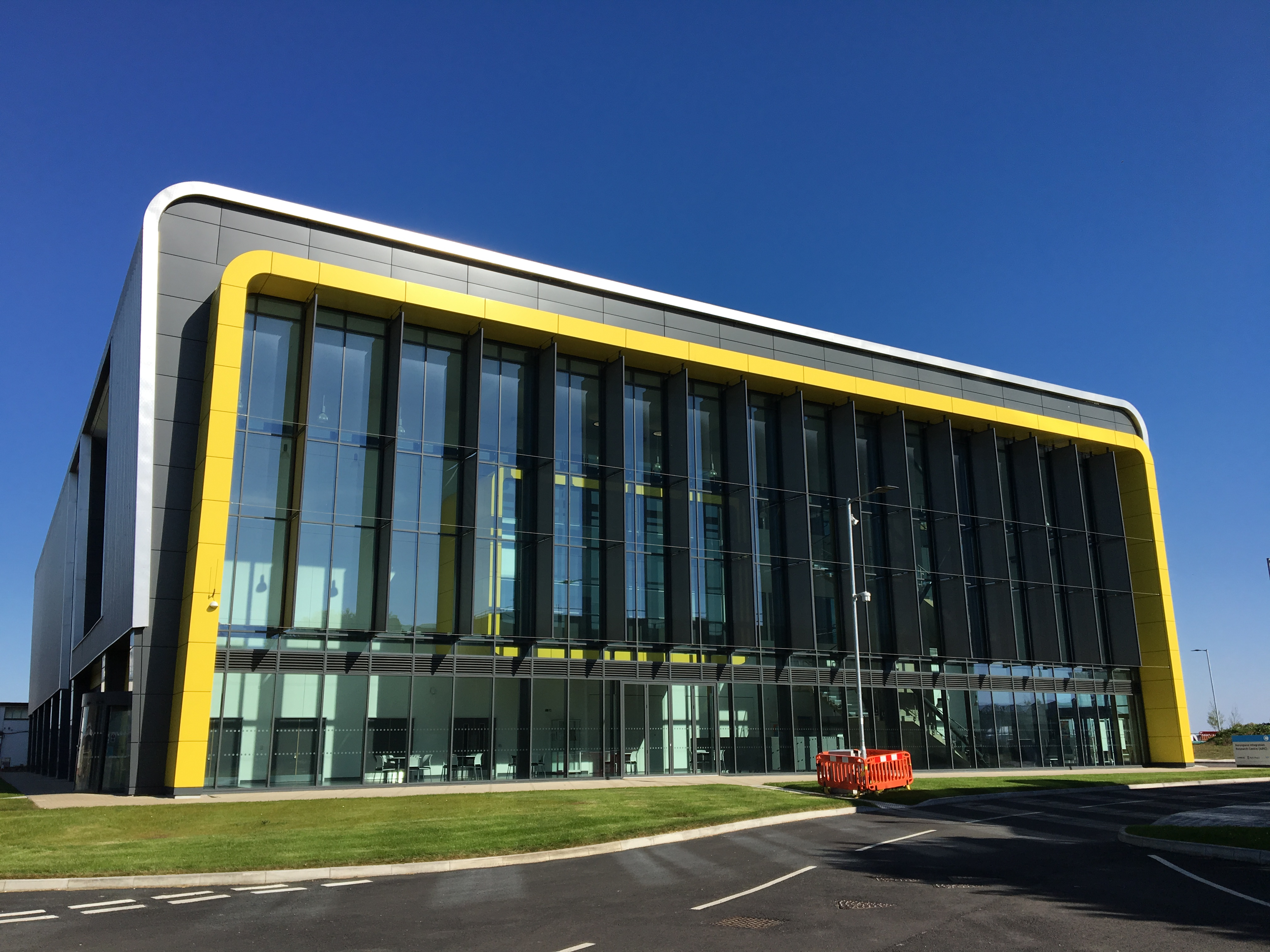
Cranfield University AIRC

=== College of Aeronautics (1946–1969) ===
Cranfield University was formed in 1946 as the College of Aeronautics, on the then Royal Air Force base of RAF Cranfield. A major role was played in the development of the college by Roxbee Cox, later Lord Kings Norton, who was appointed to be the first governor of the college in 1945 and then served as vice-chair and (from 1962) chair of the board. He led the drive for the college to diversify, with the Cranfield University School of Management being established in 1967, and petitioned successfully for a royal charter and degree awarding powers. When these were granted in 1969, he became the first chancellor of the Cranfield Institute of Technology, serving until 1997.

=== Cranfield Institute of Technology (1969–1993) ===
The Cranfield Institute of Technology was incorporated by royal charter in 1969, giving the institution its own degree-awarding powers. It is sometimes described as a university from this time, but this is disputed, with other sources dating university status from 1993, and it is often omitted from lists of universities established in the 1960s.

In 1975 the National College of Agricultural Engineering, founded in 1963 at Silsoe, Bedfordshire, was merged with Cranfield and run as Silsoe College.

An academic partnership with the Royal Military College of Science (RMCS) at Shrivenham was formed in 1984.

=== Cranfield University (1993–present) ===
In 1993 the institution's royal charter was amended changing its name to Cranfield University. A decade later in 2003, Cranfield became wholly postgraduate and the Shrivenham site admitted its last undergraduates.

In 2007, the university established an international campus, which was opened by the Prince Edward, Duke of Kent, in the Torrens Building in Adelaide, alongside Carnegie Mellon University. It offered short-term postgraduate degrees in defence management and technology, in partnership with local institutions and using some distance learning courses. However South Australia's "defence boom" did not materialise and its failure to attract enough students caused the closure of the campus in 2010.

In 2009, Silsoe College was closed and its activities were relocated to the main campus at Cranfield.

== Location and campus ==
Location of Cranfield and Shrivenham campuses in England

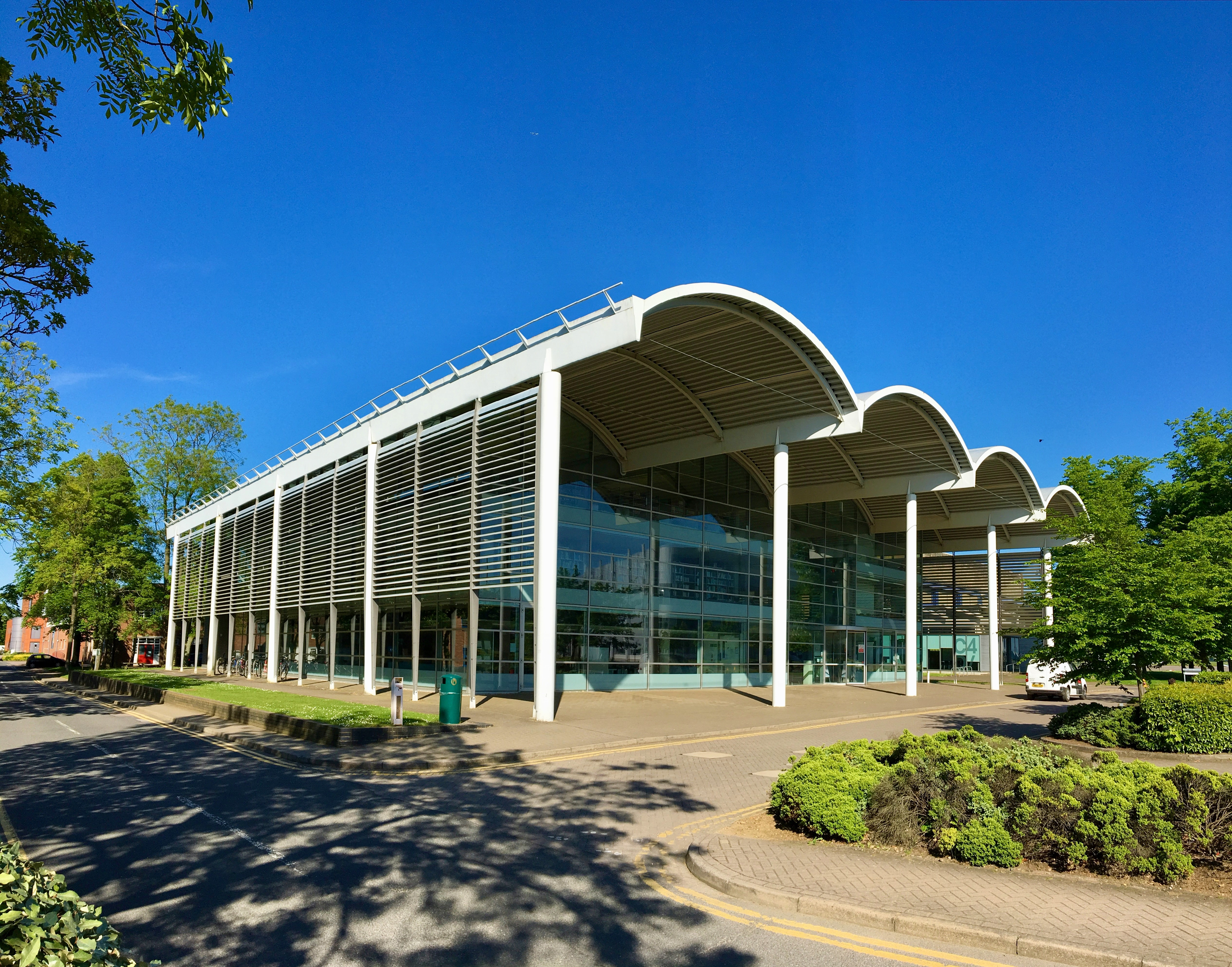
Cranfield University Library

Cranfield campus is approximately 50 miles (80 km) north of central London and adjacent to the village of Cranfield, Bedfordshire. The closest city is Milton Keynes and closest town Bedford, the centres of which are both about 8 miles (13 km) away. Cambridge is about 30 miles (48 km) east.

Shrivenham is about 73 miles (117 km) west of London, adjacent to Shrivenham village, 7 miles (11 km) from the centre of the nearest town, Swindon, and around 23 miles (37 km) from Oxford.

The Cranfield campus sits within the Cambridge – Milton Keynes – Oxford growth corridor, a region that spans Oxfordshire, Bucks, Northamptonshire, Beds and Cambs with a focus on boosting regional and national capability and productivity. There is also a proposal for a rapid transit system between (an expanding) Milton Keynes and the campus which will also connect the Universal Studios development in progress in nearby Stewartby, due for completion in 2031.

=== Technology park ===
There are a number of companies located on the Cranfield University Technology Park ranging from large international companies to small start-ups. Major companies on the park include:

- The Nissan Technical Centre Europe (Cranfield), which carries out testing, technology development and product evaluation for the European market.
- Innovation centre: The technology park is also the location for a large number of smaller companies.

Prior to 2016:

- Trafficmaster occupied a 10-acre (40,000 m^{2}) site for its European headquarters.

=== Milton Keynes ===
In 2017, Cranfield University became the academic partner in a project with Milton Keynes City Council to establish a new university, referred to as MK:U, in nearby Milton Keynes. The plan anticipated opening by 2023, with a campus in Central Milton Keynes. In January 2019, the partners announced an international competition to design a new campus near the central railway station. In May 2019, Santander Bank announced a 'seed funding' grant of £30 million to help with building and initial running costs. On 4 July 2019, the shortlisted proposals for the campus were announced. On 30 July 2019, the evaluation panel announced that Hopkins Architects had produced the winning design.

Although project plans for a new central Milton Keynes campus stalled following a government decision to deny funding, MK:U continues to operate from its Silbury Boulevard premises, delivering Level 6 apprenticeship education in Cyber Security, Digital and Technology Solutions, Supply Chain Leadership, Project Management, Data Science and Chartered Management.

== Coat of arms ==
Coat of arms of Cranfield University
Crest On a wreath Argent and Gules, out of an Astral Crown Azure in front of an owl wings displayed Argent two keys addorsed wards upwards Or. Escutcheon Per chevron barry undy Or and Azure and Azure in base a torch of three branches Or inflamed Proper. Supporters On either side a crane Proper, pendant from the neck of each a Crown Rayonnée Or; the whole on a Compartment composed of a marshy bank with reeds Proper. Motto 'Post Nubes Lux'

The university's motto, post nubes lux, means "after clouds light". It is depicted on the university coat of arms which was introduced when the university was awarded its royal charter.

== Organisation and governance ==
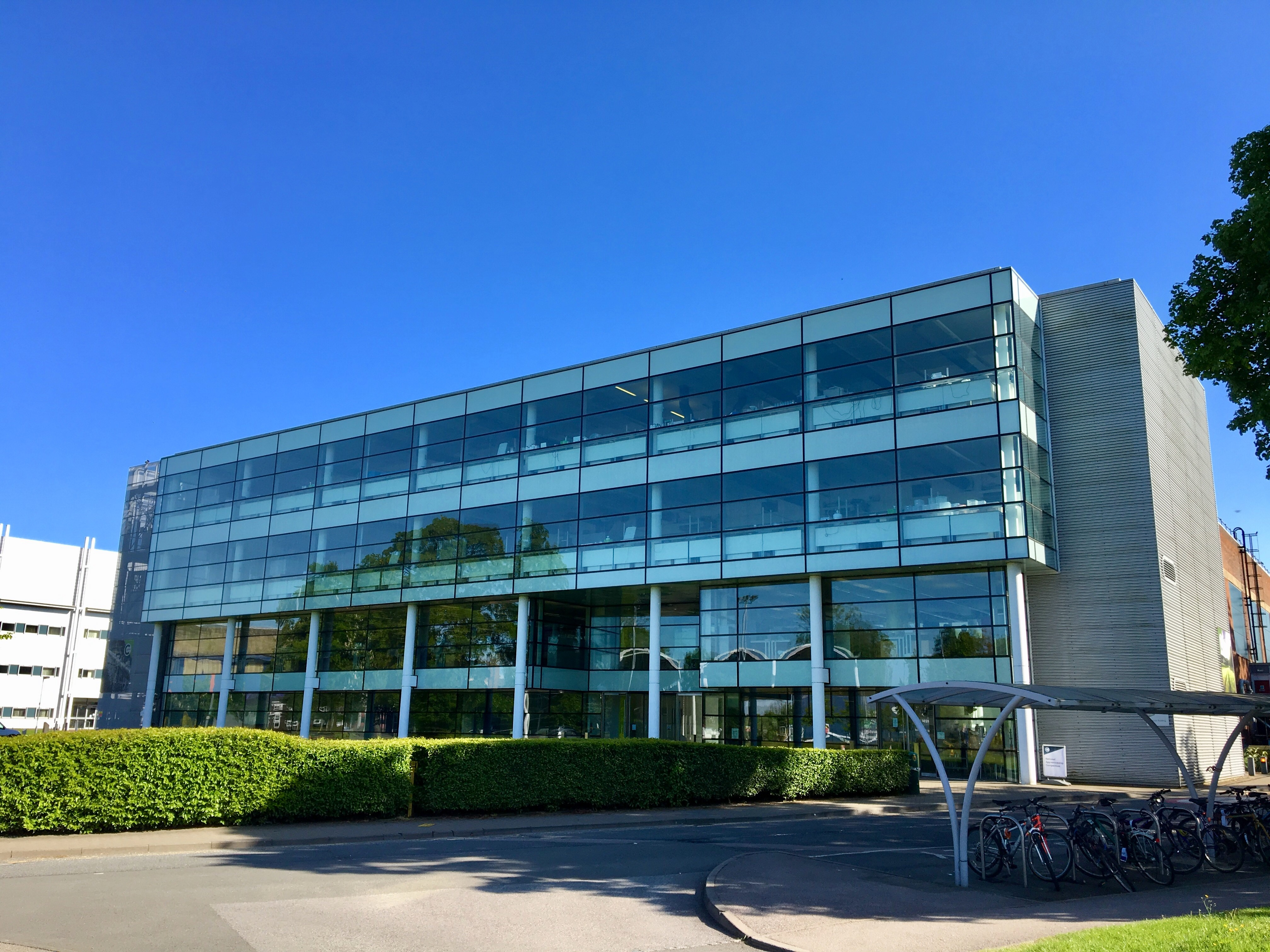
Cranfield University Vincent Building

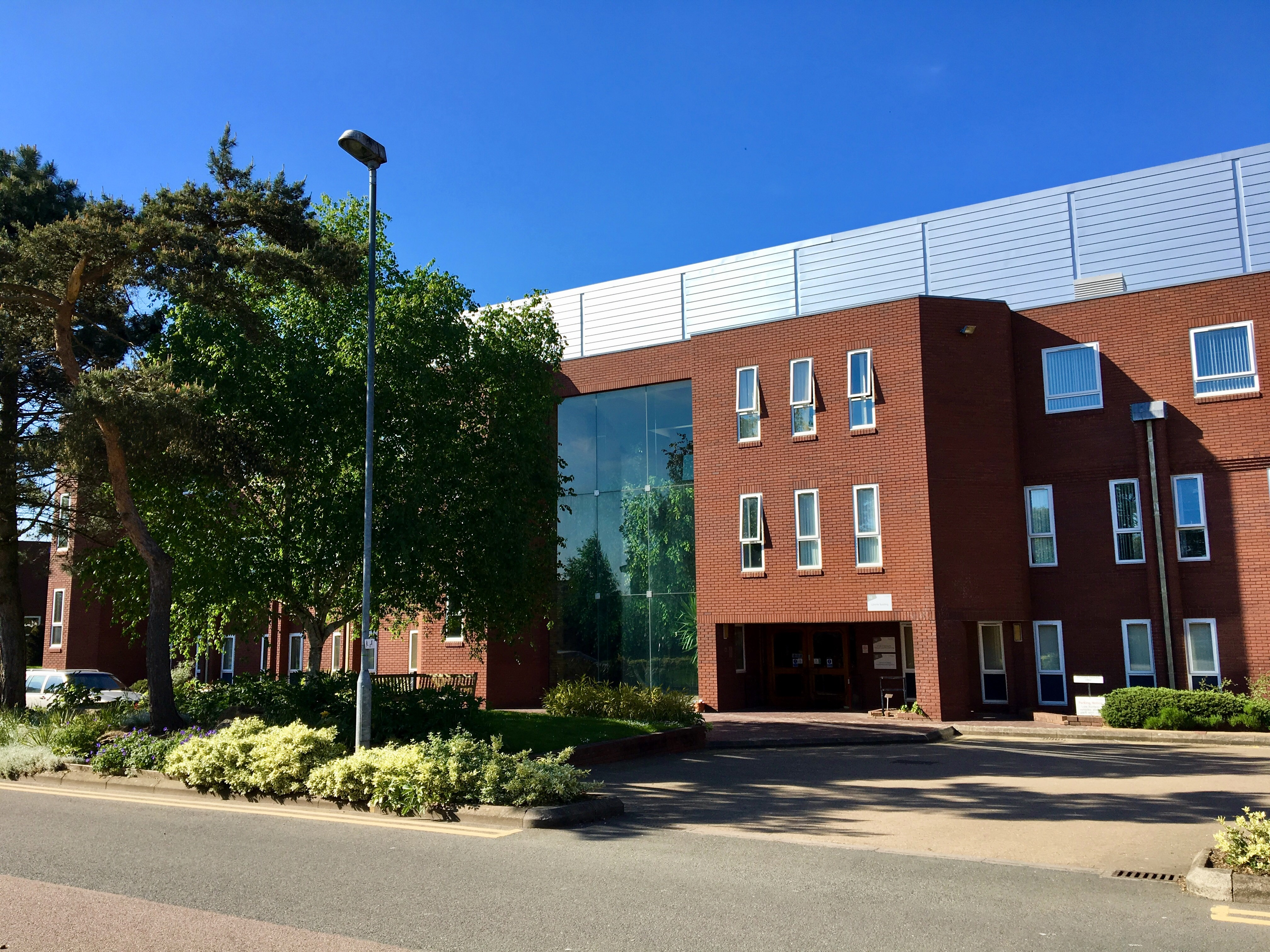
Cranfield University Whittle Building

=== Chancellors ===
- 1969–1997: Harold Roxbee Cox, Lord Kings Norton
- 1998–2010: Richard Vincent, Lord Vincent of Coleshill
- 2010–2020: Baroness Young of Old Scone
- 2021–2024: Dame Deirdre Hutton
- 2024–present: Julia King, The Baroness Brown of Cambridge

=== Vice-chancellors ===
- 1970–1989: Henry Chilver, Lord Chilver
- 1989–2006: Frank Robinson Hartley
- 2006–2012: Sir John (James) O'Reilly
- 2013: Clifford Michael Friend – interim vice-chancellor
- 2013–2021: Sir Peter Gregson
- 2021–present: Dame Karen Holford

=== Faculties ===
Cranfield is arranged into two faculties: business and management, and engineering and applied sciences.

=== Academic specialisms ===
Cranfield's 23 specialisms are sector-aligned. They can be accessed via postgraduate taught degrees, postgraduate research degrees, professional learning including short courses and customised programmes, research projects with industry, or consultancy with academic experts.

- Advanced manufacturing
- Aerospace
- Agrifood
- AI and Robotics
- Automotive
- Aviation
- Banking and finance
- Business
- Clean energy
- Computer science
- Defence
- Design engineering
- Entrepreneurship
- Environment
- Hydrogen
- Leadership and skills
- Marketing and sales
- Materials engineering
- Forensic Science
- Safety
- Security
- Space
- Supply Chain
- Water

== Academic profile ==
=== Reputation and rankings ===
Rankings
Global rankings
- ARWU (2026): 801–900

As an exclusively postgraduate university, Cranfield University is excluded from the Times Higher Education World University Rankings, the QS World University Rankings, The Times/The Sunday Times' Good University Guide, the Complete University Guide and The Guardian University Guide, which focus on helping prospective undergraduate students to compare universities.

- Eighty-eight per cent of Cranfield's research was rated world-leading or internationally excellent in the 2021 Research Excellence Framework.
- Cranfield University was ranked in the world top 30 for mechanical, aeronautical and manufacturing engineering in the 2024 QS World University Rankings by Subject. In business and management, Cranfield had a top 150 position, and it also had a top 200 position in environmental sciences and materials science.
- Cranfield is ranked 193rd globally in the QS World University Rankings: Sustainability 2026.
- Cranfield has received the Queen's Anniversary Prize six times: in 2005 for Further and Higher Education for the Fellowship in Manufacturing Management (FMM) programme; in 2007 for its role in humanitarian demining; in 2011 for contribution to aviation safety through research and training in accident investigation; in 2015 for its work in water and sanitation; in 2017 for its research and education in large-scale soil and environmental data for the sustainable use of natural resources. and in 2019 for the work of the National Flying Laboratory Centre;
- Students on Cranfield's Global Security programme were awarded the Imbert Prize in 2006, 2008 and 2009 for the development of ideas for the advancement of risk and security management in the UK.

=== Admissions ===
Cranfield welcomes around 5,000 postgraduate students from more than 100 countries each year. 41% of Cranfield University's students are over 30 years of age.

=== Partnerships ===
Cranfield University has links with business, industry and governments. Cranfield University has mutually beneficial relationships with nearly 1,500 organisations around the world including small owner-managed SMEs to large multinational conglomerates; British and international universities, non-government organisations and governments. Some of Cranfield's close partnerships include Airbus, Rolls-Royce Group, Grant Thornton, BAE Systems, Boeing, Lockheed Martin, Ford, BP, British Airways, PWC, Jacobs, Metro Bank, L'Oréal, Royal Dutch Shell, Jaguar Land Rover, Oracle Corporation, PepsiCo, Unilever, to name just a few.

Cranfield University has links with more than 130 universities in the Americas, Asia and Oceania, Europe, Middle East and Africa. The university collaborates with the Singapore University of Social Sciences (SUSS) on SUSS's BEng Aerospace Systems.

The IMRC – Innovative Manufacturing Research Centre at Cranfield University is a project funded by the EPSRC (Engineering and Physical Sciences Research Council) undertaking research that addresses issues identified in the UK government's High Value Manufacturing strategy.

== Student life ==
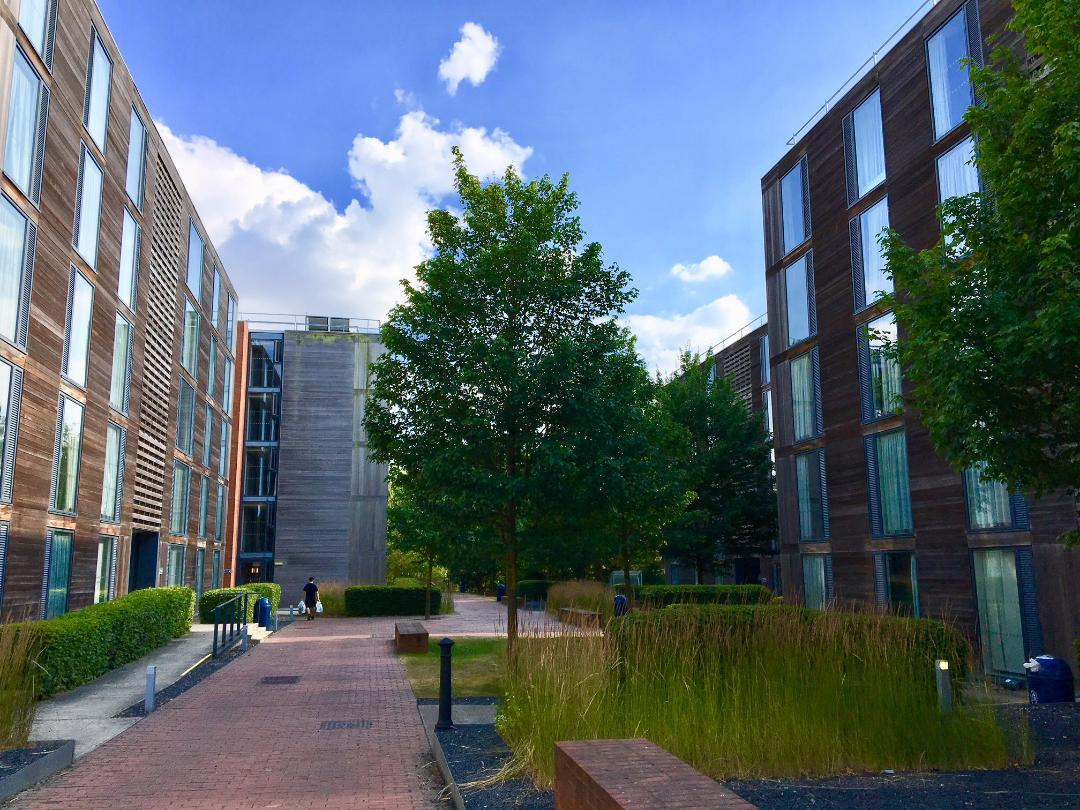
Cranfield University Student Accommodation

Facilities at the Cranfield University campus include a sports centre, which incorporates a fitness centre and aerobics studio, playing fields, sports pitches and several tennis courts. On campus there are two small shops, one run by the CSA and one by Budgens. There are a limited range of eateries open during mealtimes, two Costa Coffee outlets, and one bar, also run by the CSA, which is open intermittently Monday to Friday.

=== Students' union ===
Cranfield Students Association (CSA) is the students' union and runs the main student bar, cafe and shop on the Cranfield campus. It is based in building 114 close to the centre of the campus.

The CSA is run by a team of elected students and supported by a small team of staff. The aim of the CSA is to support and represent Cranfield University students, promote student welfare and organise social, cultural and sporting activities.

=== Student accommodation ===
At the Cranfield University campus, accommodation for full-time students includes halls of residence, shared houses, apartments for couples and houses for families.

For part-time students, there are two options available – the 186-room Cranfield Management Development Centre and the 114-room Mitchell Hall, both of which are situated on campus.

== Notable current and former staff ==
- Dame Helen Atkinson - engineer
- Cyril Cleverdon – librarian and computer scientist

== Notable alumni ==
Cranfield University has a number of notable academic staff and alumni, including politicians, business people, entrepreneurs, engineers, scientists, authors, and TV personalities. Cranfield University was in the top 1% of institutions in the world for alumni who hold CEO positions at the world's top companies, according to the Centre for World University Rankings in 2017.

- Sophie Adenot - Astronaut, one of the candidates selected in the 2022 European Astronaut Corps
- Nader Al-Dahabi - Former prime minister of Jordan
- Akinwunmi Ambode - Former Governor Lagos State, Nigeria
- Michael Bear (Lord Mayor) - The 683rd Lord Mayor of London
- Katherine Bennell-Pegg, Australian astronaut
- Karan Bilimoria – Founder and chairman, Cobra Beer Ltd
- Crispin Blunt – Member of Parliament for Reigate
- Andy Bond – Former CEO, Asda
- Clifford Braimah - Managing Director Ghana Water Company Limited
- Winnie Byanyima - Executive director of Oxfam International
- L. J. Clancy – author of Aerodynamics (1975)
- Nigel Doughty - Former co-chairman and co-founder of Doughty Hanson & Co
- Warren East – Former CEO, Rolls-Royce Holdings
- Andy Harrison – Former CEO, Whitbread
- Jack Hathaway - Astronaut, one of the 10 candidates selected in the 2021 NASA Astronaut Group 23.
- John Hull – Professor of Derivatives and Risk Management at the University of Toronto
- Major Charles Ingram - English fraudster and novelist
- Antony Jenkins – former Group Chief Executive, Barclays
- Nick Jenkins – Founder of online greetings card retailer Moonpig, former "dragon" on the BBC Two business series Dragons' Den
- Stathis Kefallonitis – neuroscientist and member of the leadership team at United Airlines
- Siddhartha Lal - chief executive officer and managing director of Eicher Motors, and chairman and managing director of VE Commercial Vehicles
- Martin Lamb – chief executive, IMI plc
- John McFarlane – executive chairman, Barclays
- Samer Majali - CEO / President of Royal Jordanian airlines
- Charlie Mayfield – chairman, John Lewis Partnership
- Sahir Shamshad Mirza - Chairman Joint Chiefs of Staff Committee of Pakistan (2022–2025)
- Lara Morgan – founder, Company Shortcuts
- Brian Norton – solar energy technologist, President, Dublin Institute of Technology
- Andy Palmer - Former CEO, Aston Martin
- Nigel Quinn, water resources engineer, earth scientist
- Sarah Quraishi - Co-founder of Aero Engine Craft Pvt. Ltd. Pakistan.
- Juan Rafael Elvira Quesada – served as Secretary of the Environment (Mexico)
- Lyndon Smith - Professor in Computer Simulation and Machine Vision, University of the West of England
- Haslina Taib - CEO Dynamik Technologies, Brunei
- Ashitey Trebi-Ollennu - robotics engineer at NASA
- Ted Tuppen – CEO, Enterprise Inns Plc
- James Vowles - team principal at Williams Racing Formula 1 team
- Sarah Willingham – entrepreneur and former "dragon" on the BBC Two business series Dragons' Den
- Balakrishnan Suresh - Air Marshal and Chief of WAC in Indian Air Force
- Satya Widya Yudha - Member of the National Energy Council of the Republic of Indonesia
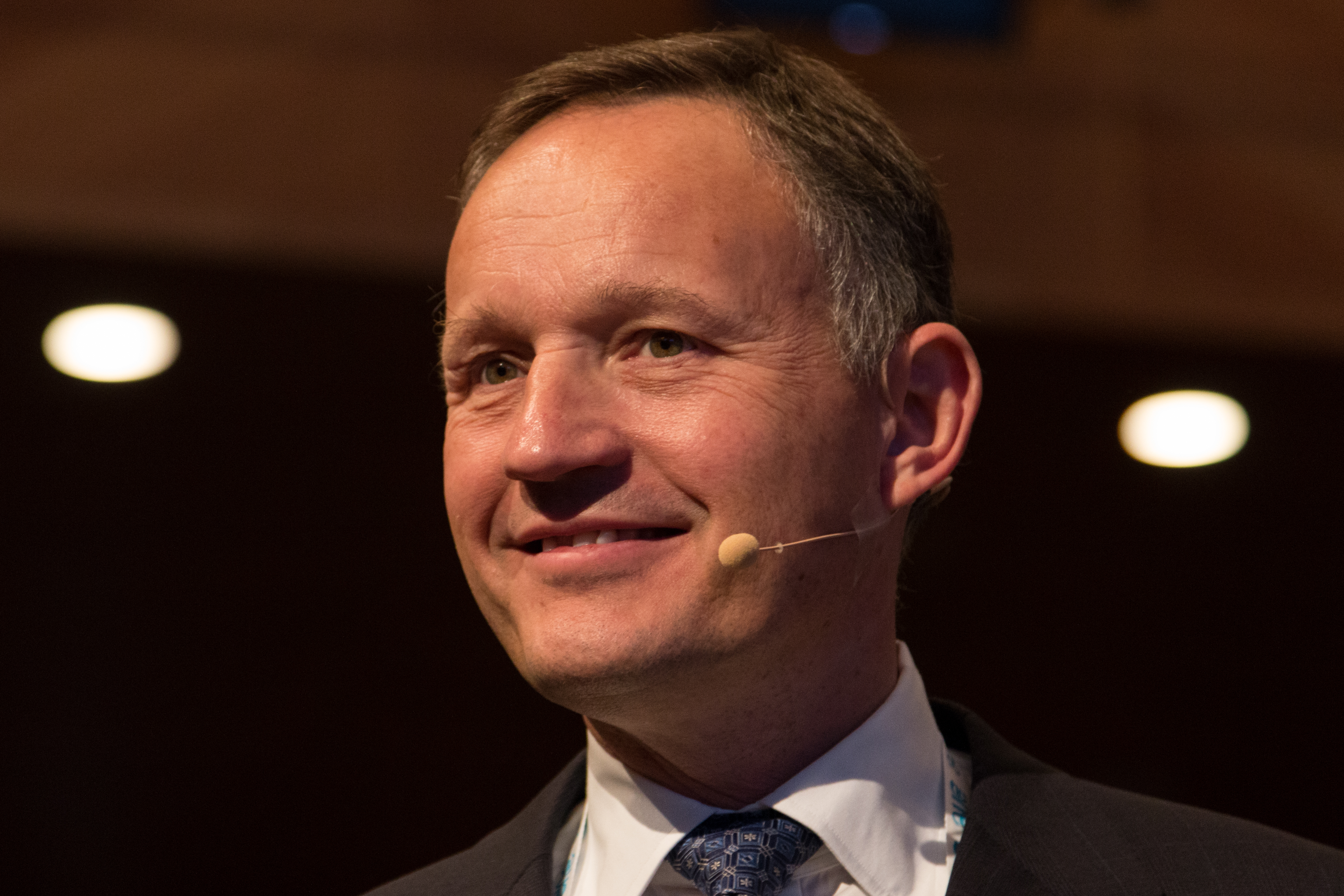
Antony Jenkins – former group chief executive, Barclays

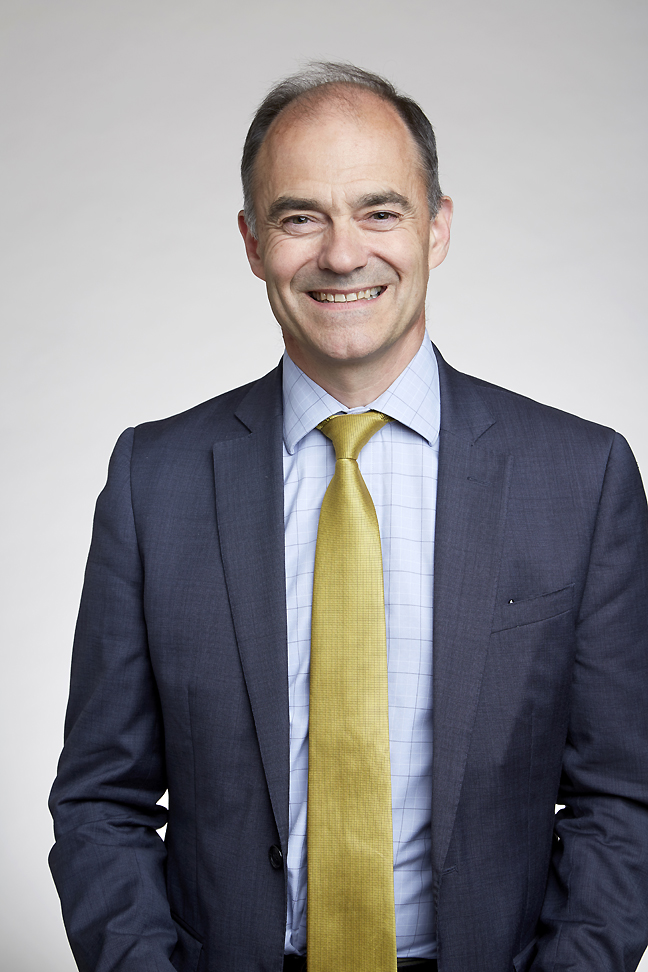
Warren East – former CEO, Rolls-Royce Holdings

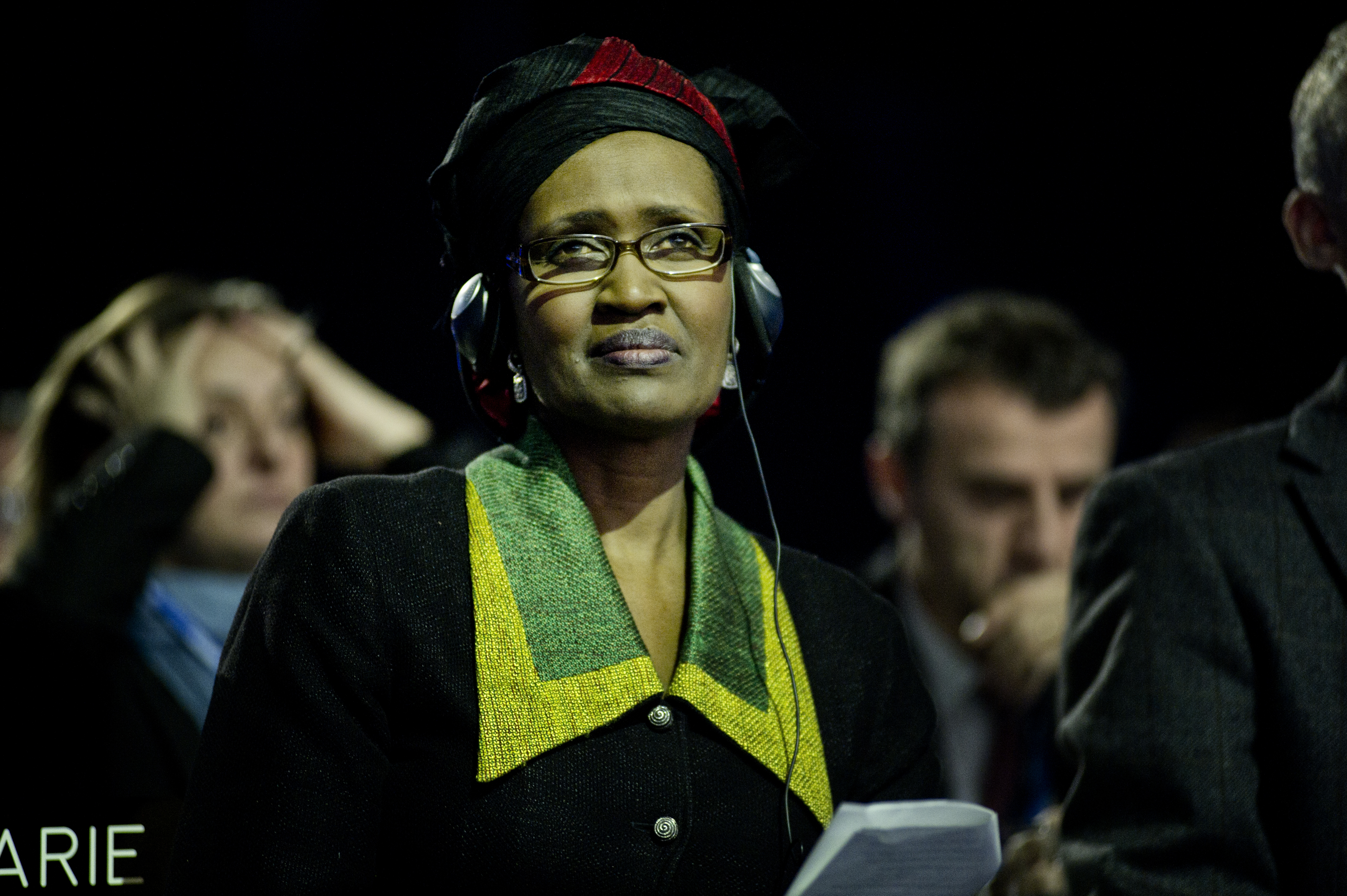
Winnie Byanyima – executive director of UNAIDS

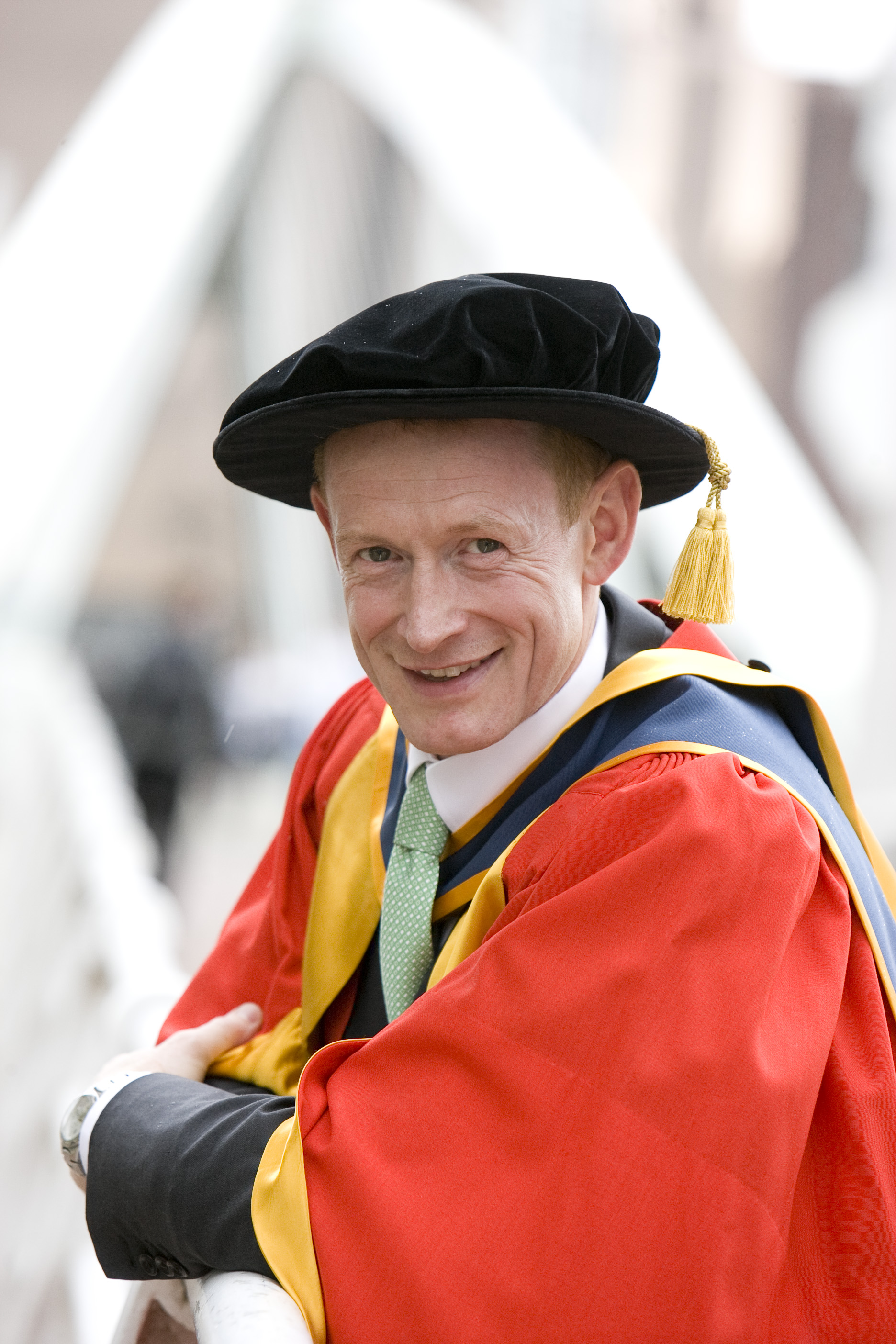
Andy Bond – former CEO, Asda

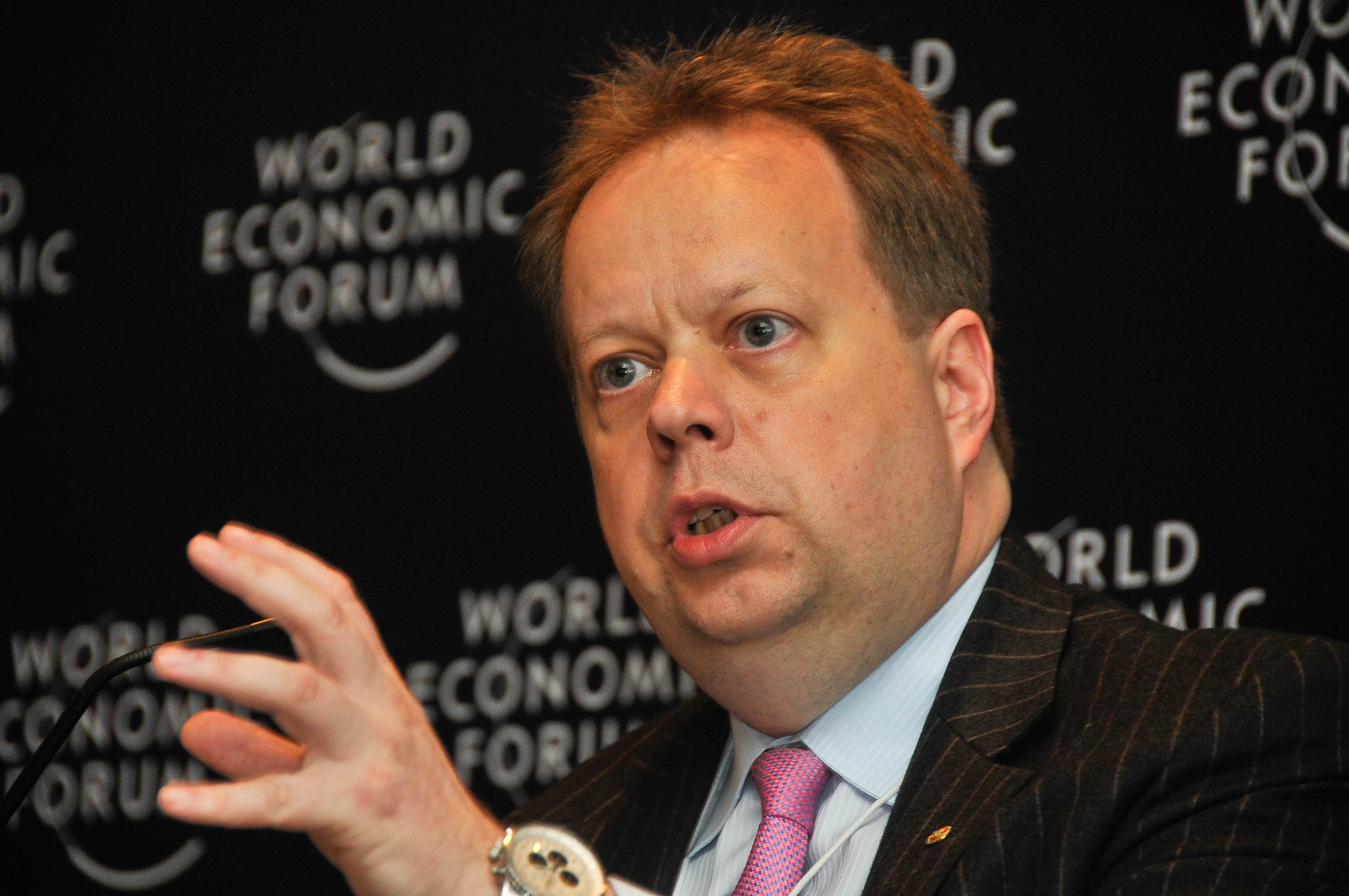
Andy Palmer – former CEO, Aston Martin

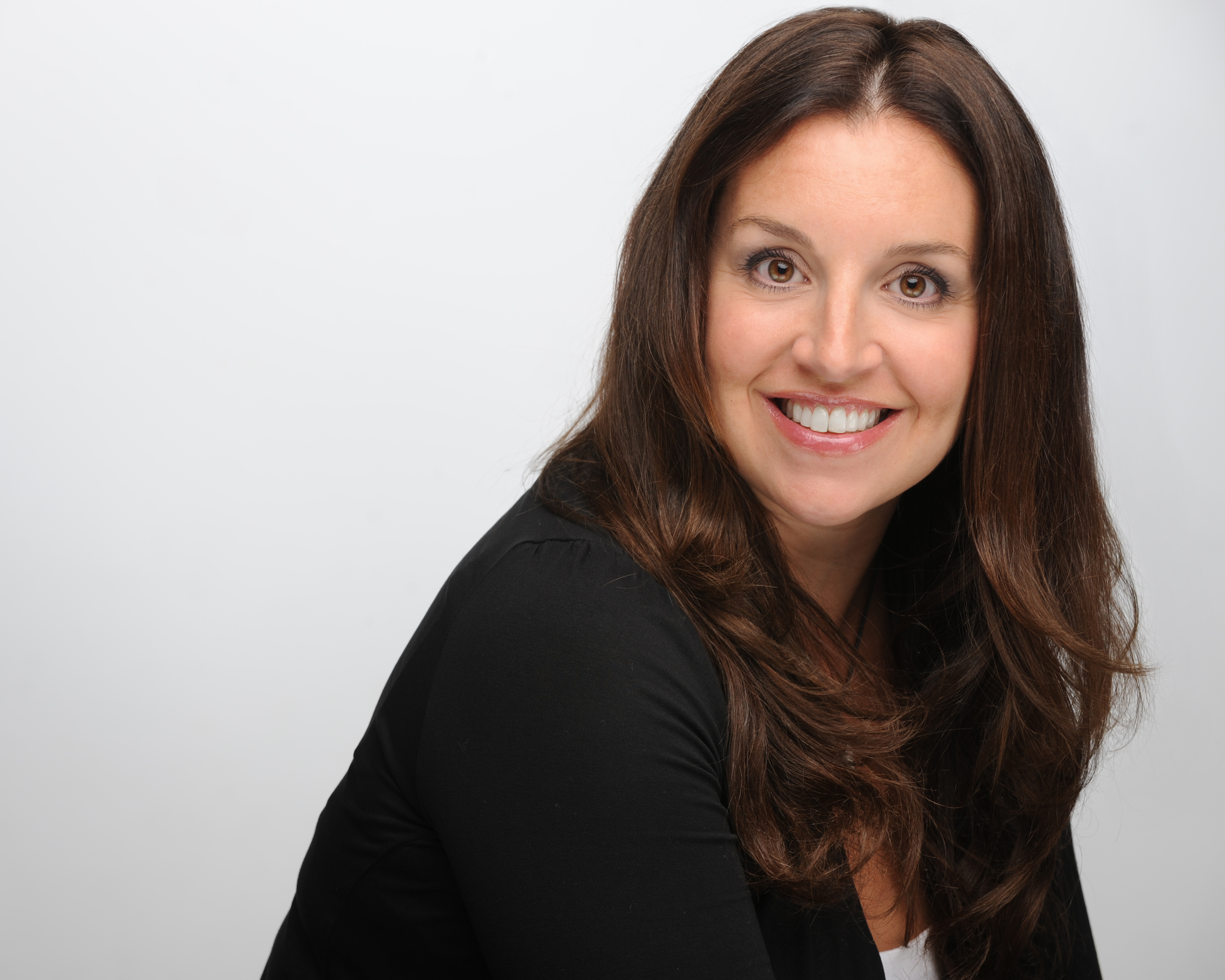
Sarah Willingham – entrepreneur and former "dragon" on the series Dragons' Den

== Gallery ==
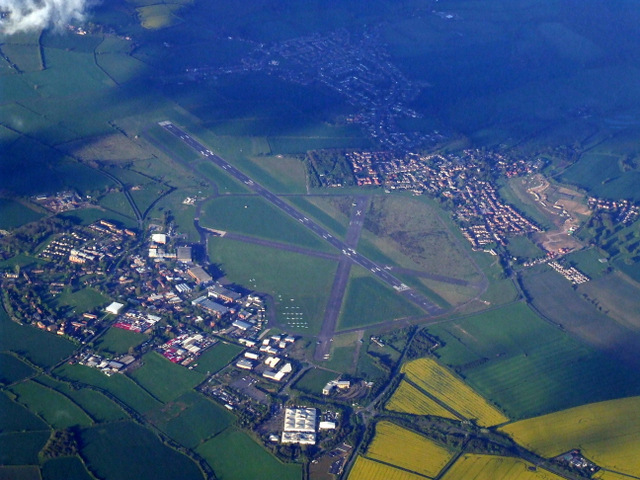
Cranfield University Birdseye view

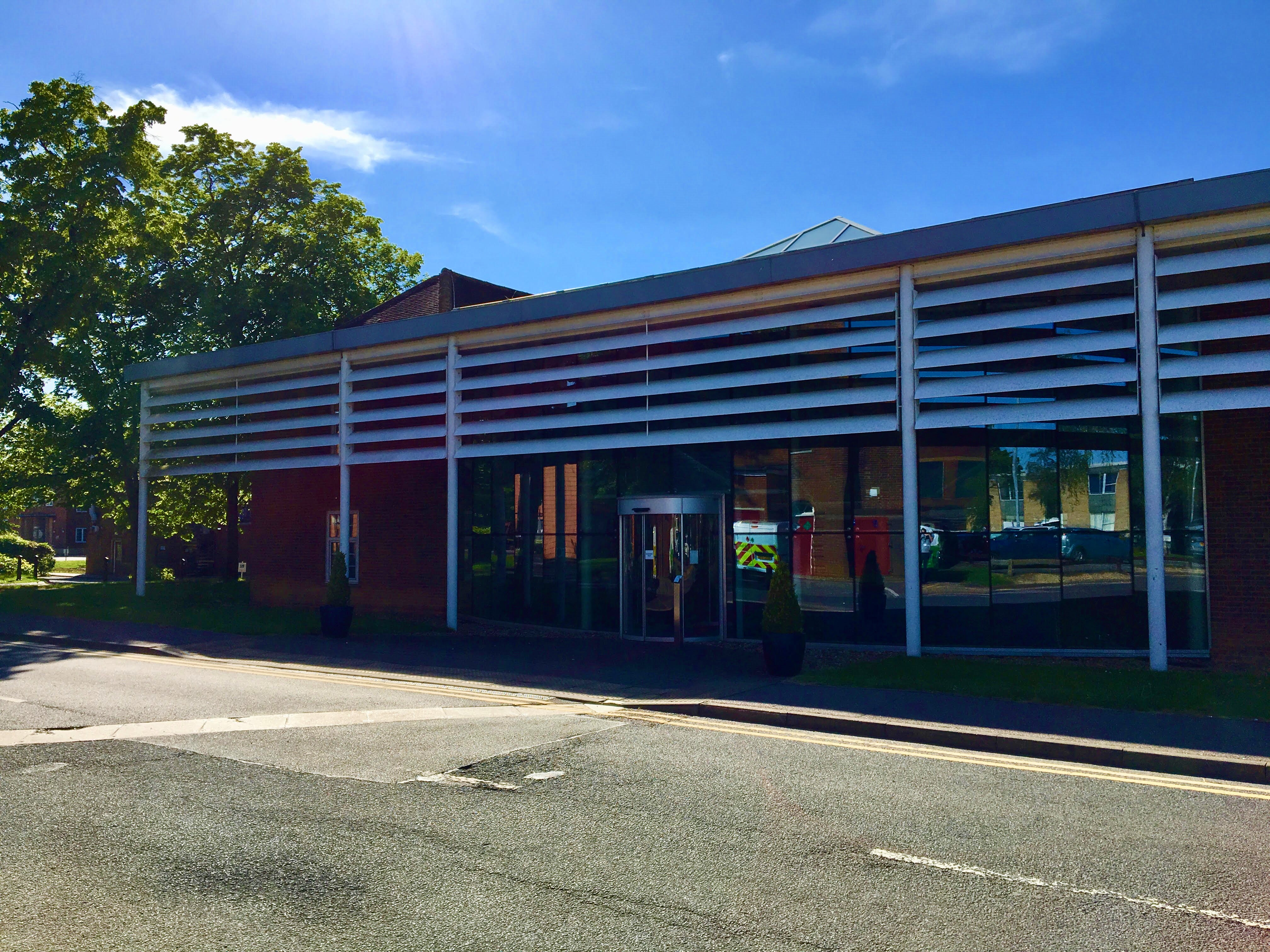
Cranfield University CMRI

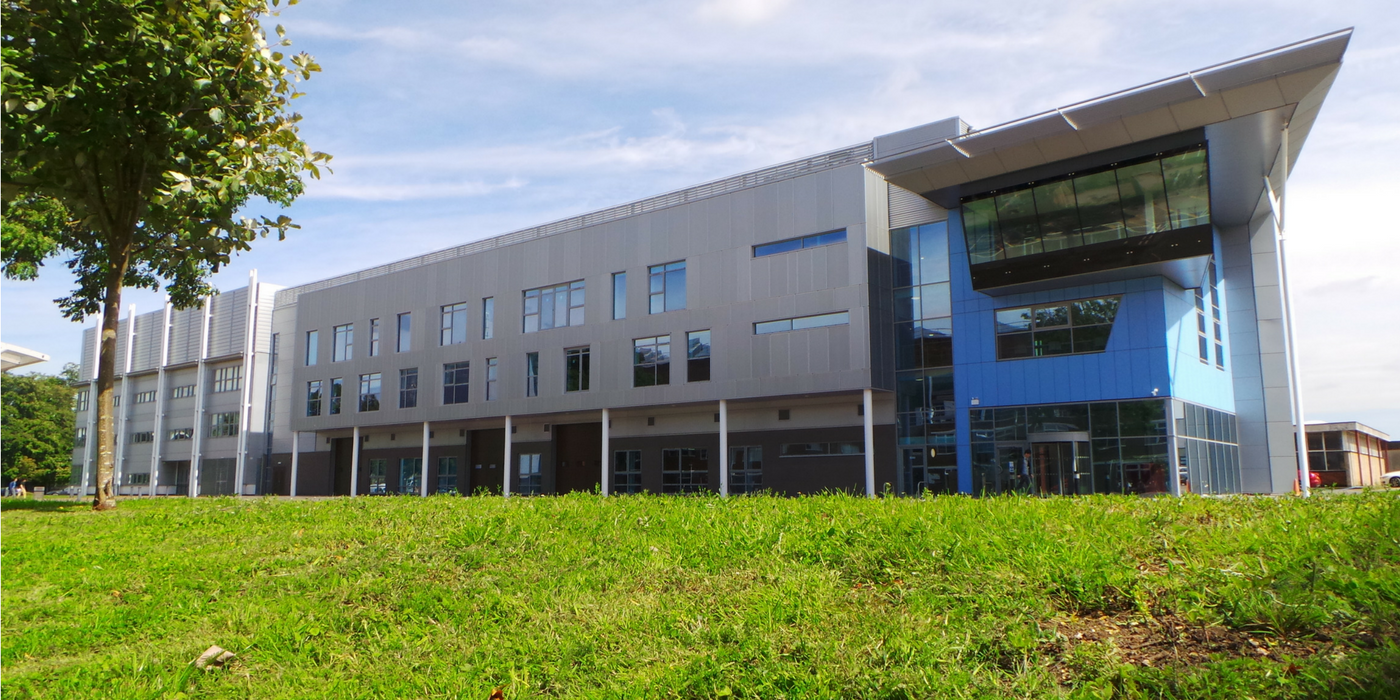
Cranfield University IMEC

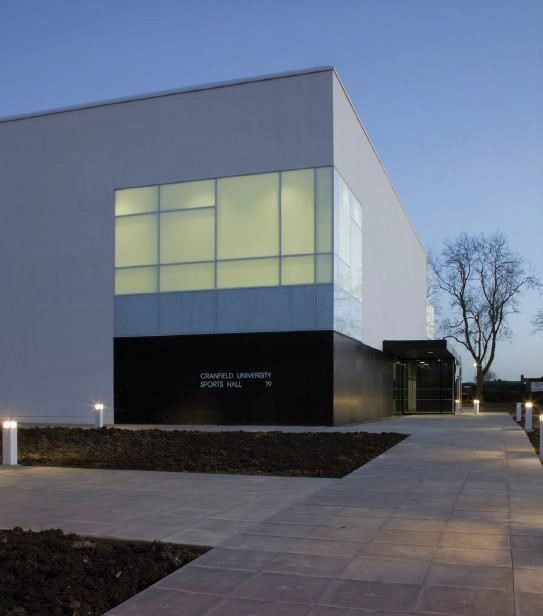
Cranfield University Sports Hall

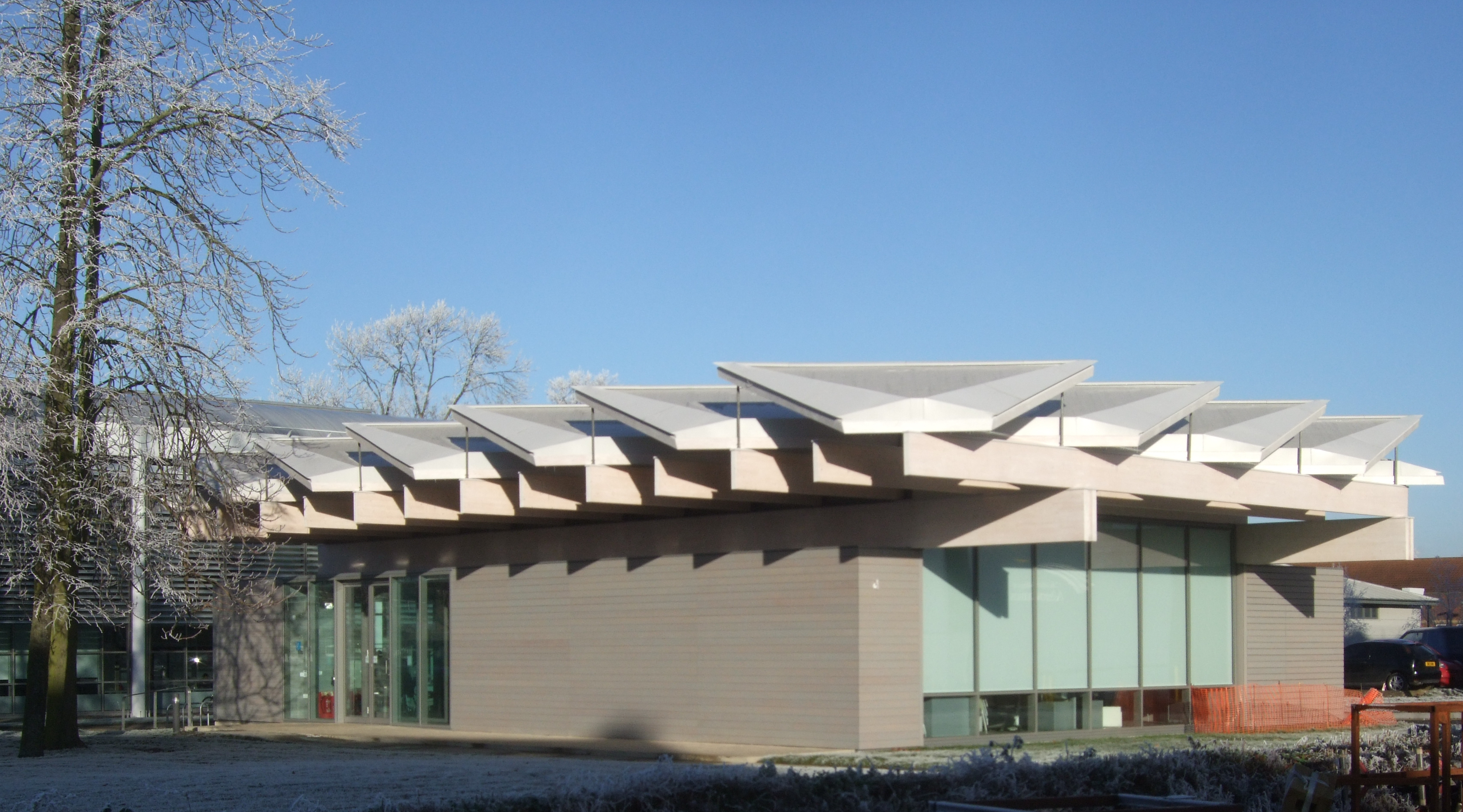
C4D Building, the Centre for Creative Competitive Design, opened 2010

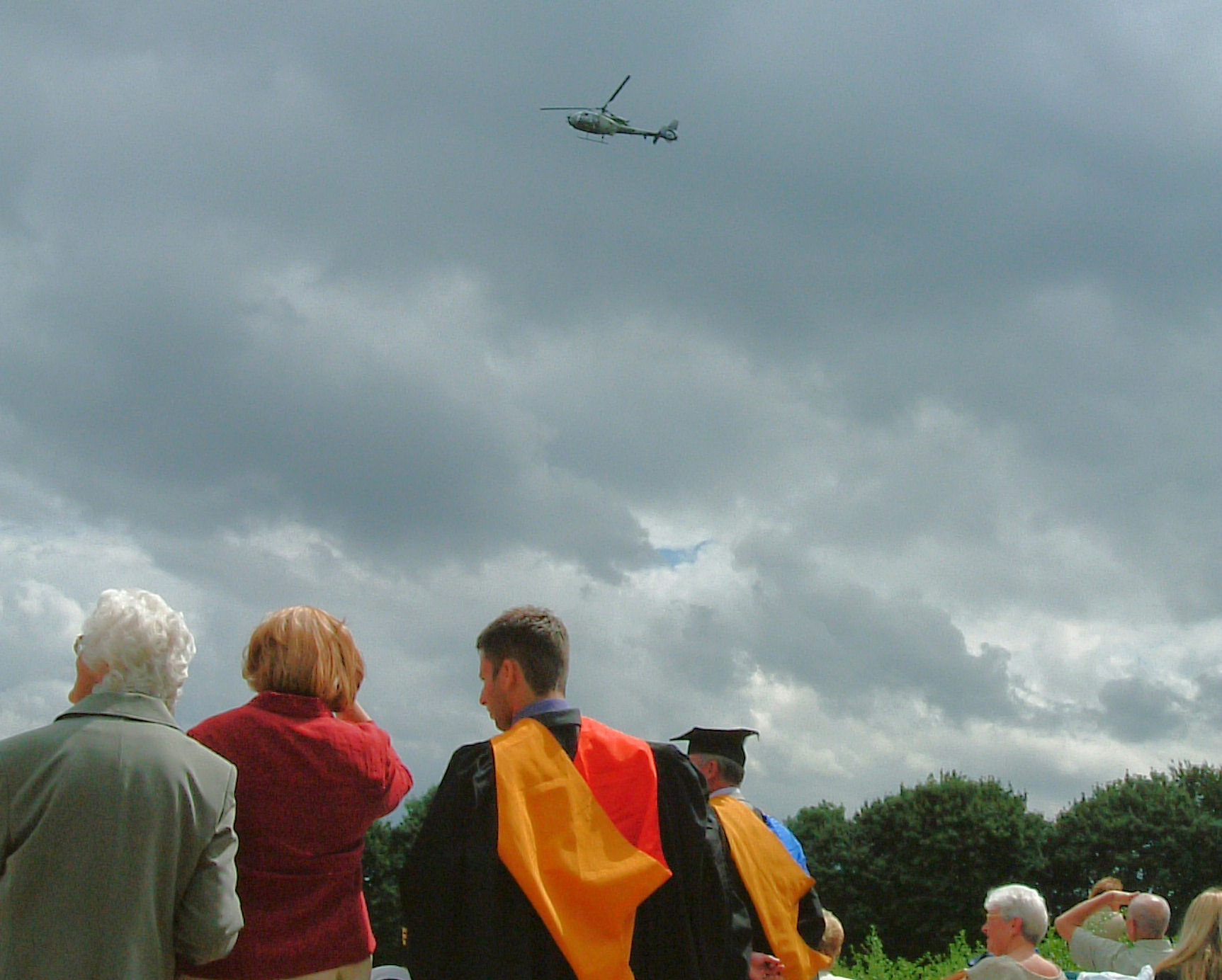
Army helicopter display team, graduation 2004

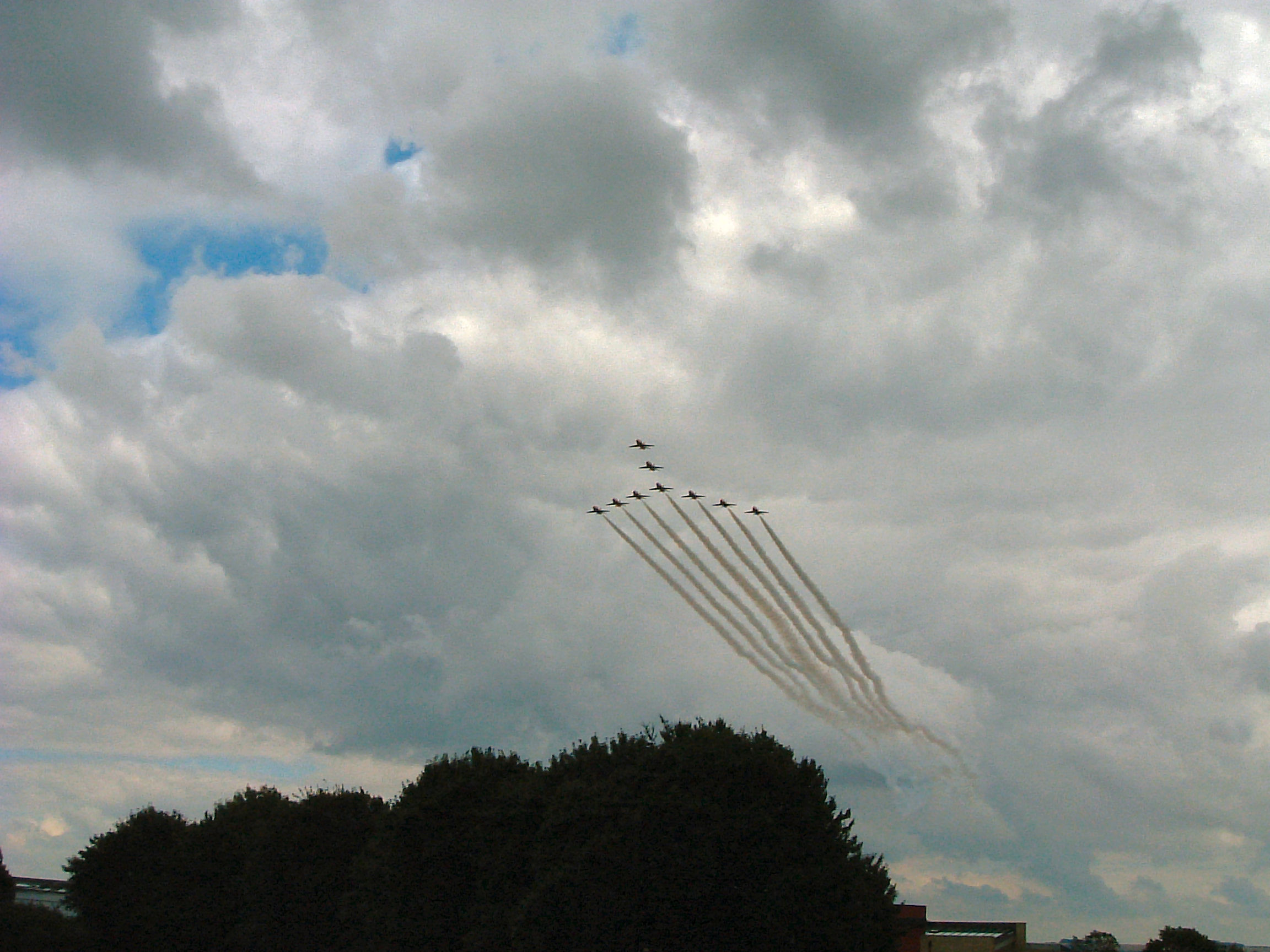
RAF Red Arrows display team, Shrivenham graduation, July 2003

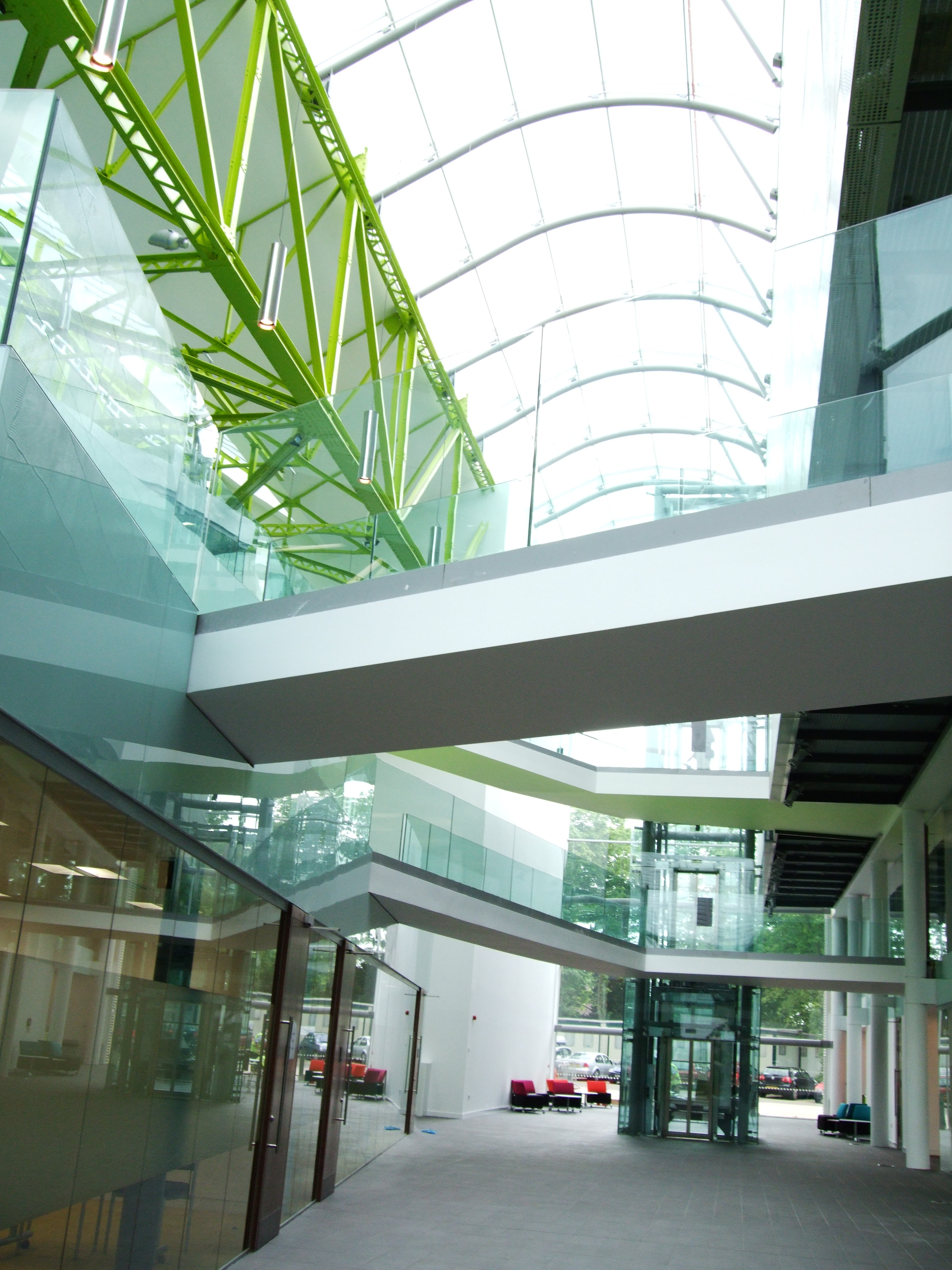
The new Vincent Building's interior, June 2008

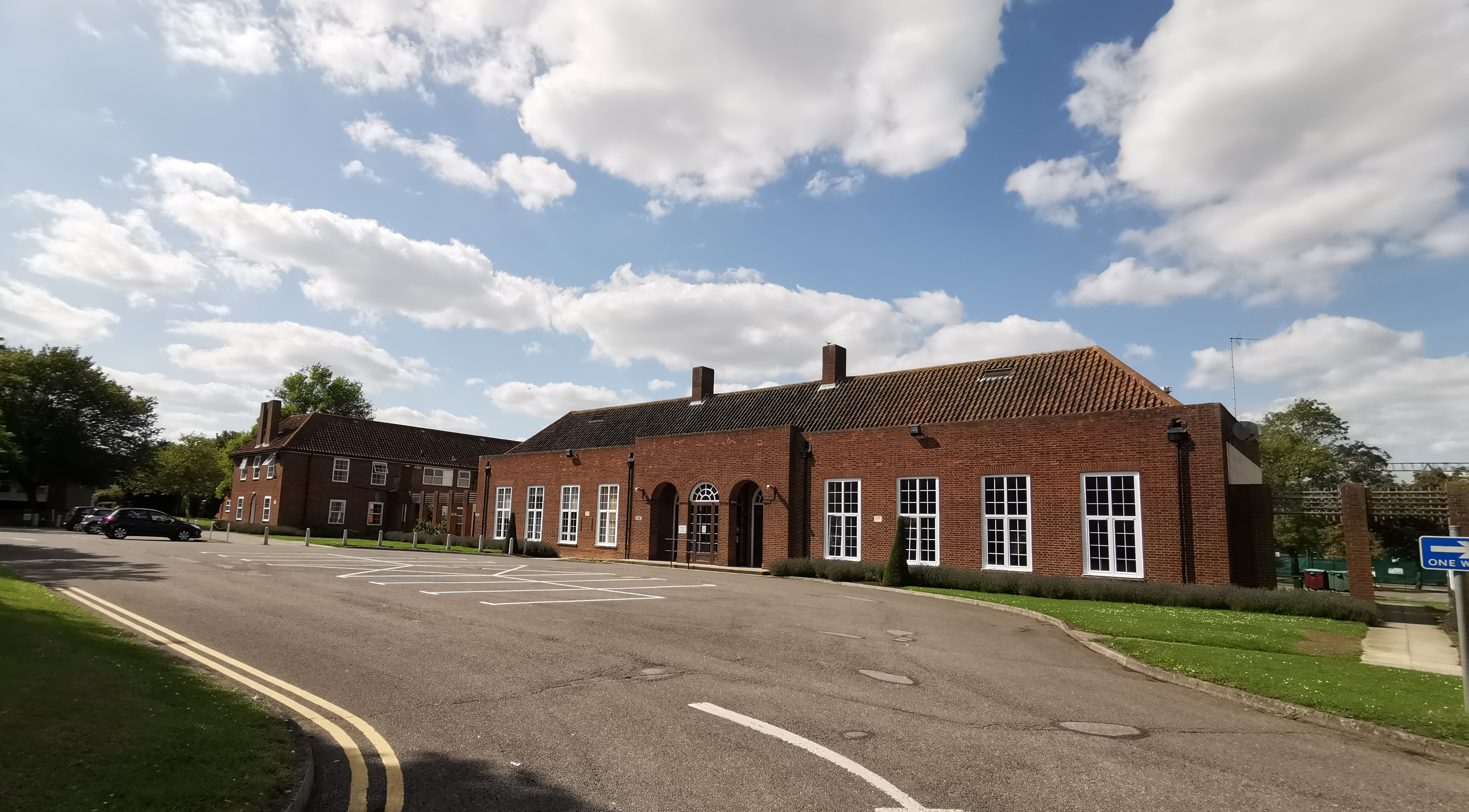
Lanchester Hall

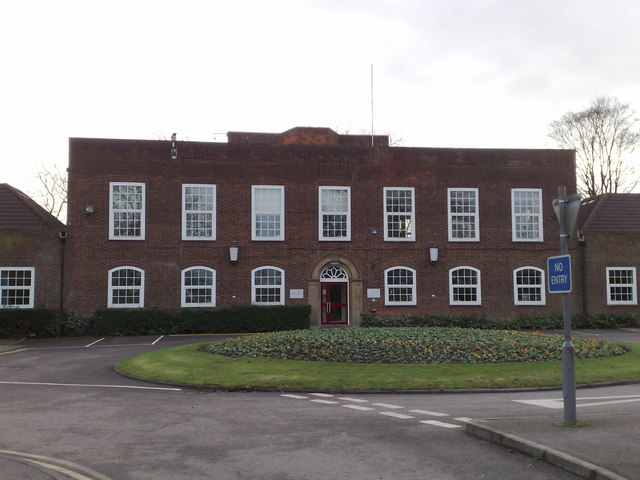
Kent House

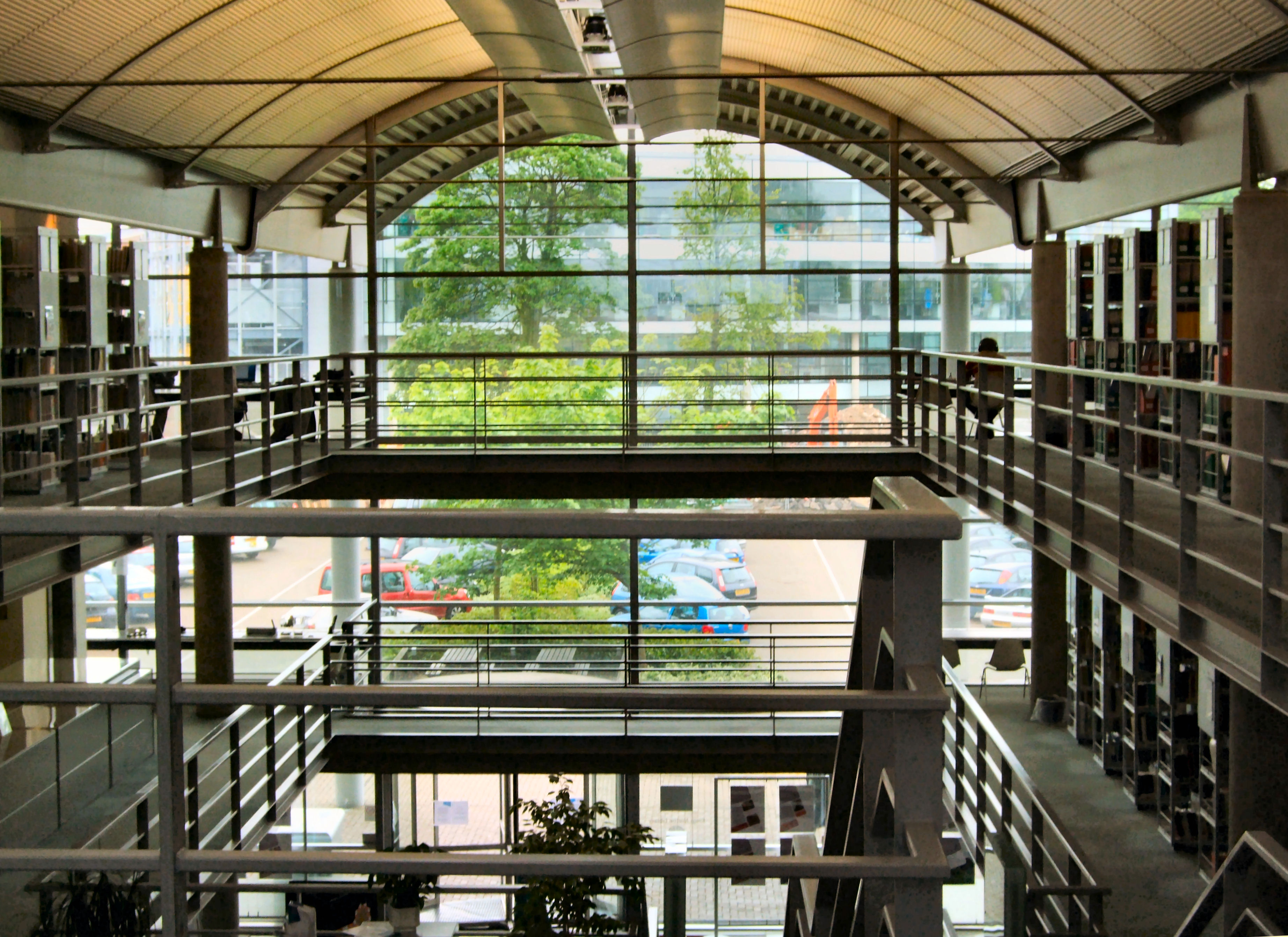
Cranfield Library

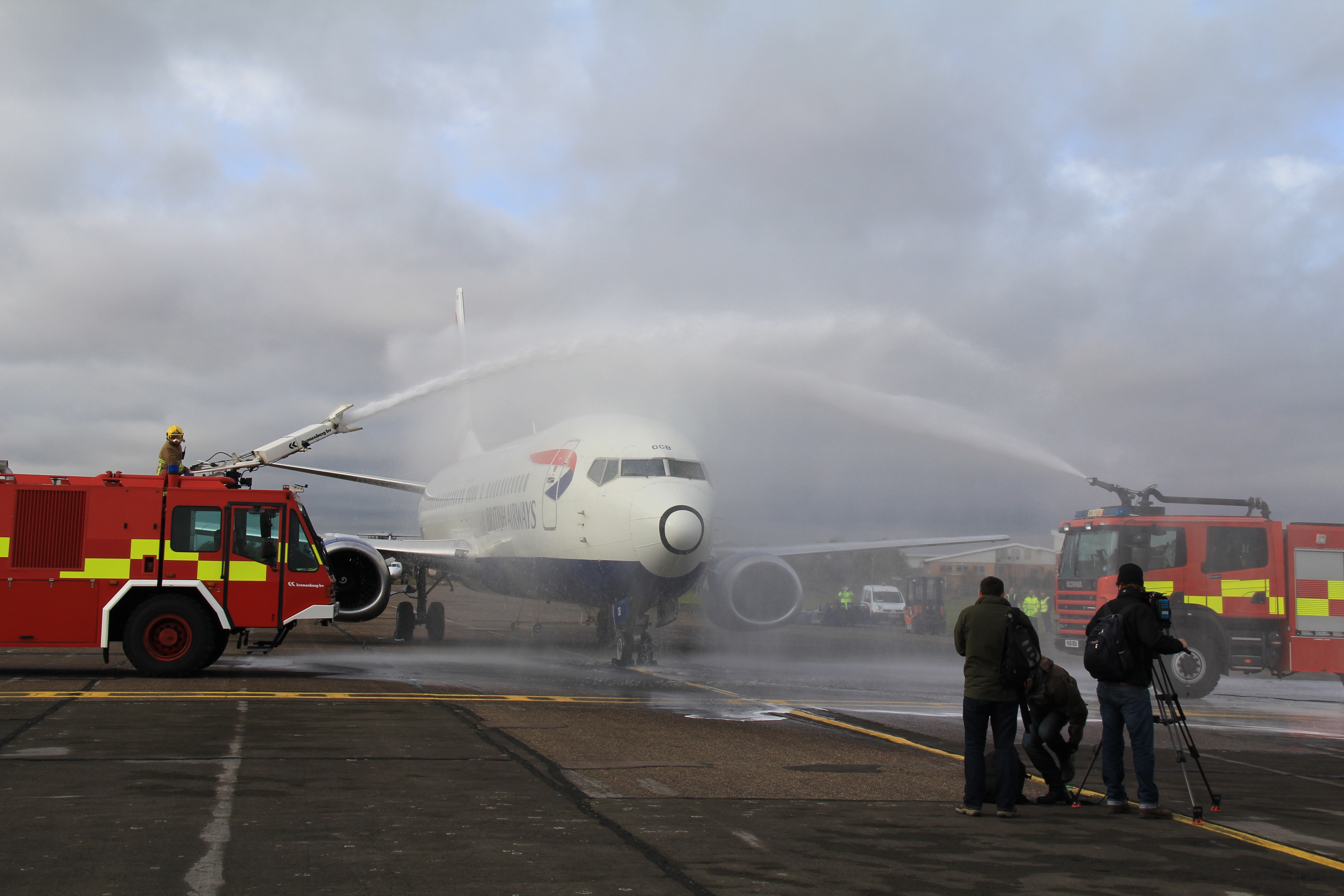
Boeing 737 G-DOCB arrives at Cranfield University

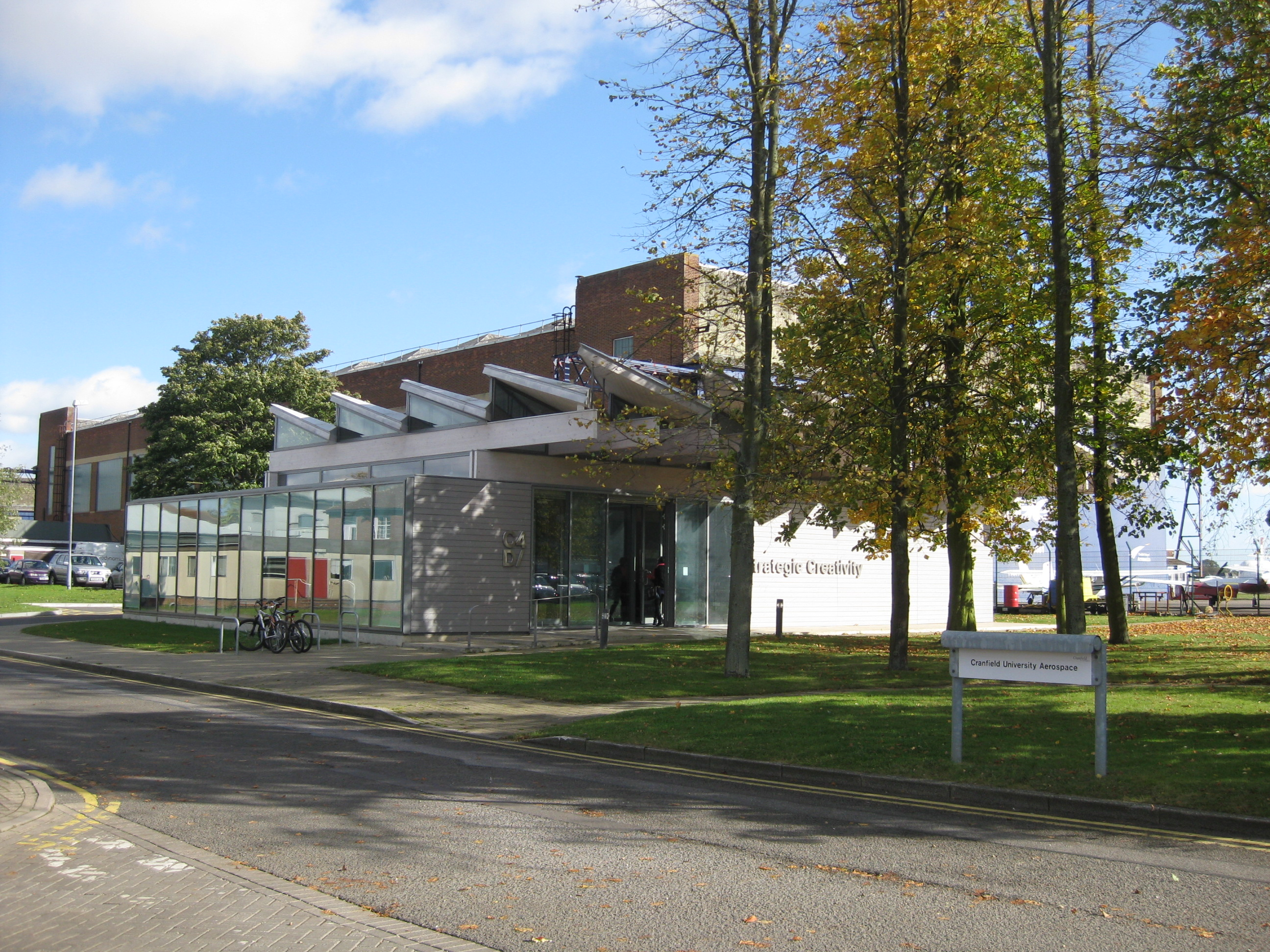
Cranfield University C4D Centre for Design

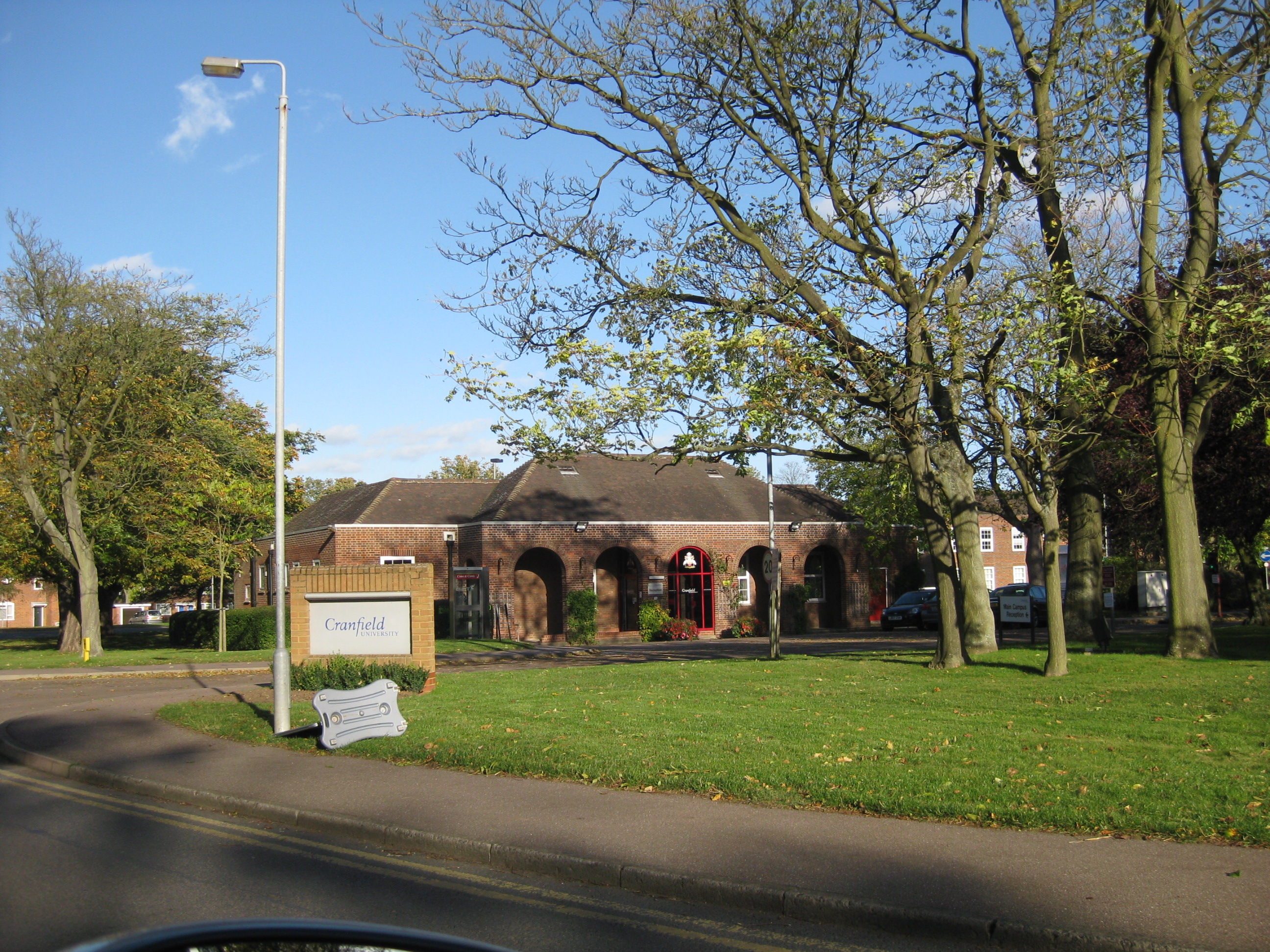
Cranfield University

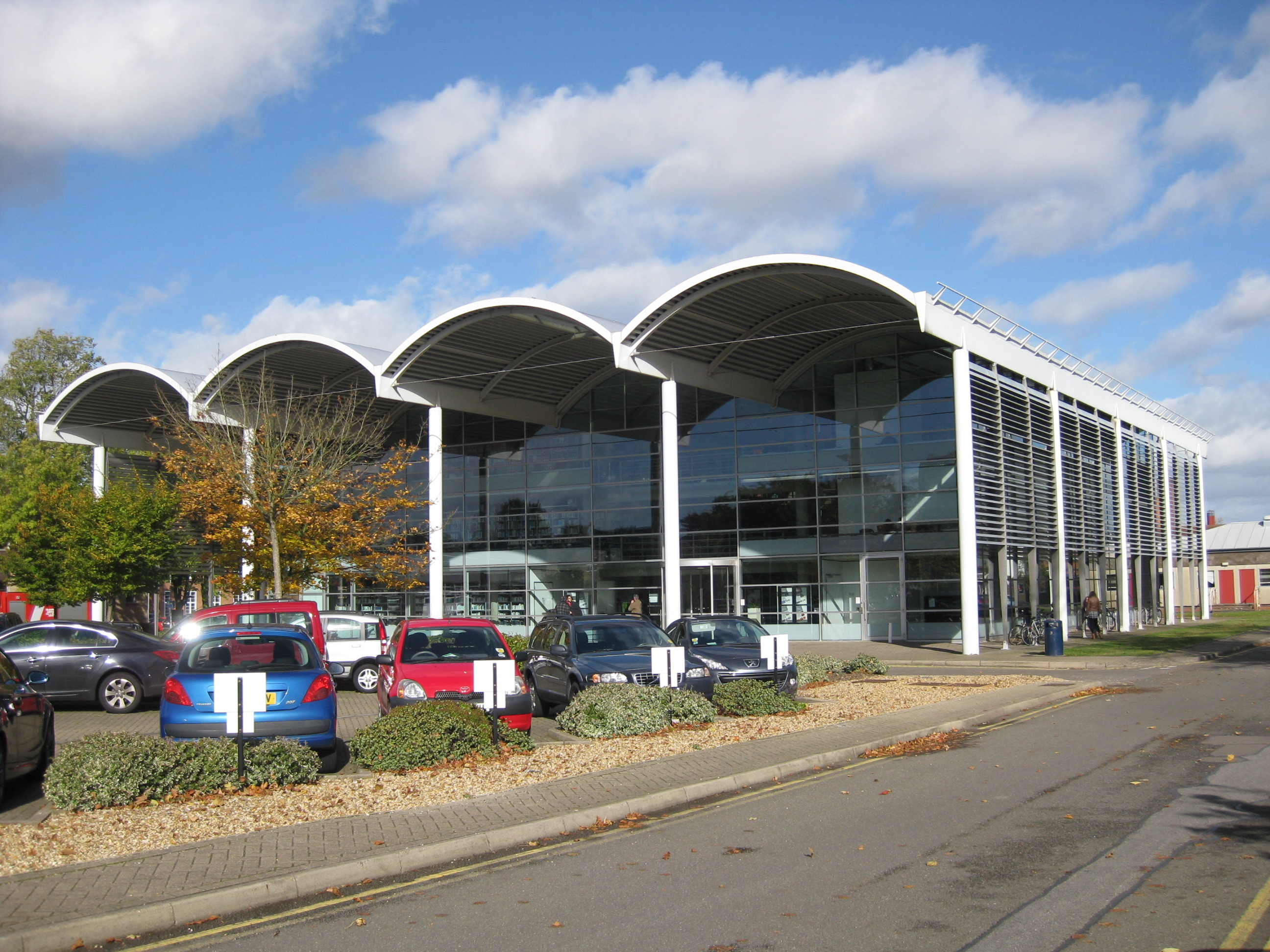
Cranfield University Library

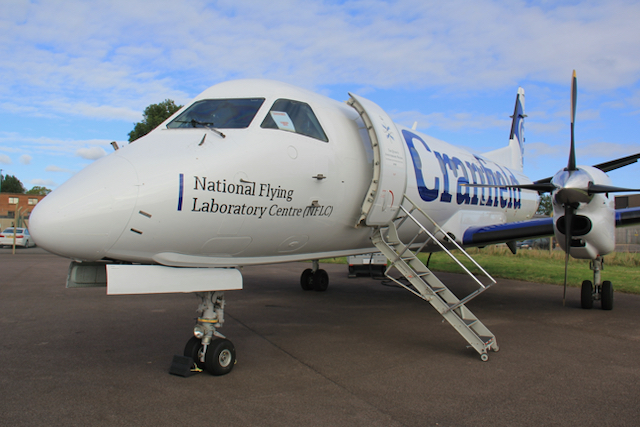
Cranfield's Flying Classroom

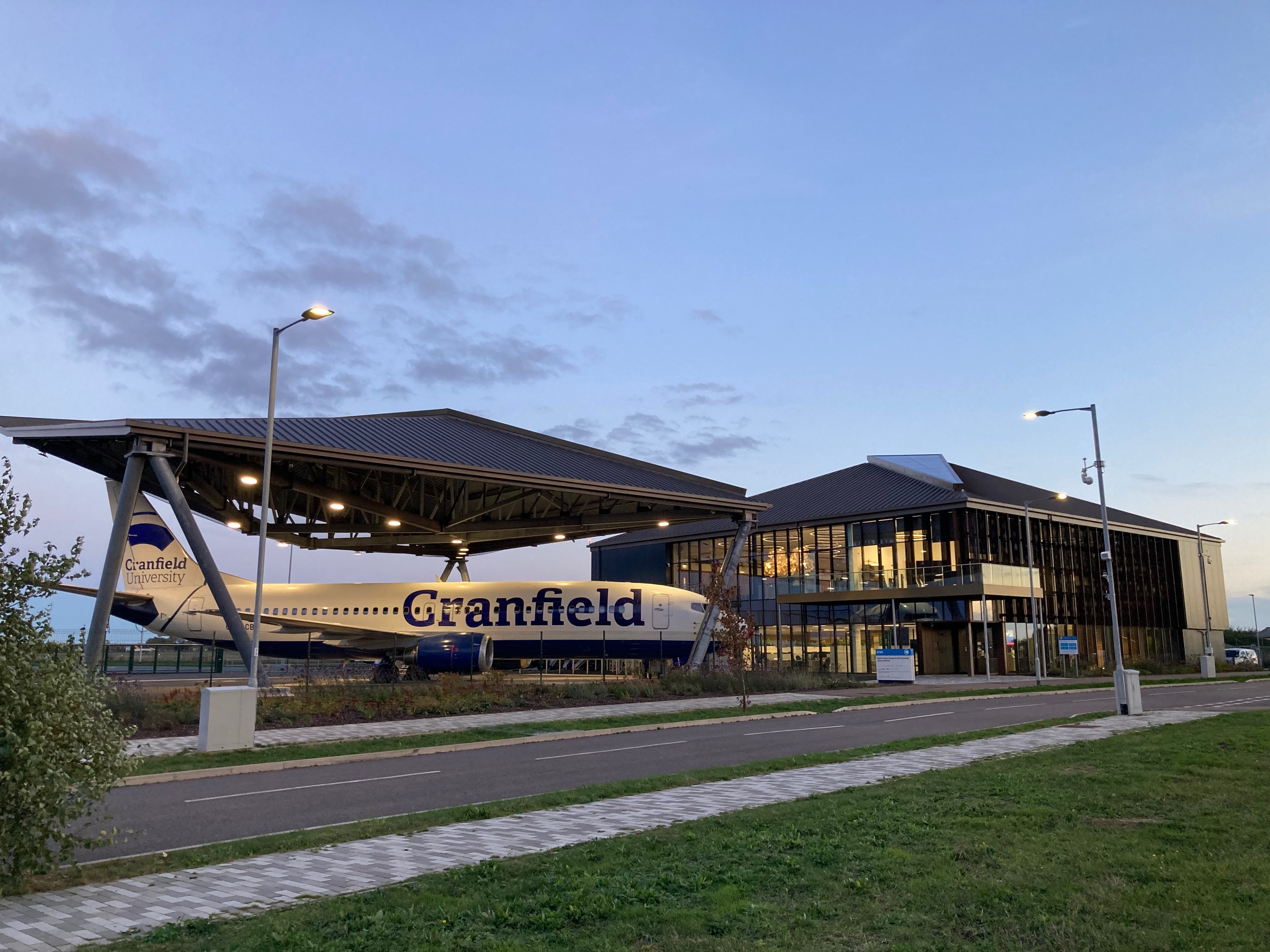
Digital Aviation Research and Technology Centre

== See also ==
- Academics of Cranfield University
- Armorial of UK universities
- Cranfield experiments
- Cranfield Institute
- Facility for Airborne Atmospheric Measurements
- List of UK universities
- Royal School of Military Survey
