= FMM =

FMM may refer to:

- Confederation of Malagasy Workers (Malagasy: Fivondronamben'ny Mpiasa Malagasy)
- Fast multipole method
- Functional membrane microdomain
- Father Michael McGivney Catholic Academy, in Markham, Ontario, Canada
- Fellowship in Manufacturing Management, a program of Cranfield University, England
- Festival Músicas do Mundo, a Portuguese music festival
- Field Marshal Montgomery Pipe Band
- Flea Market Music, an American publisher
- Florida Maritime Museum
- Fort Morgan Municipal Airport, in Colorado, United States
- Fourier modal method, an alternative name for rigorous coupled-wave analysis
- France Médias Monde
- Franciscan Missionaries of Mary
- Free Media Movement
- Mainz-Mombach station, in Germany
- Memmingen Airport, in Germany
- World Federation for the Metallurgic Industry, a former global union federation
