= Doughty Centre for Corporate Responsibility =

The Doughty Centre for Corporate Responsibility is a British research centre at Cranfield School of Management that is focused on corporate responsibility.

== History ==
The centre was established in 2007 at the Cranfield School of Management, Cranfield University in the United Kingdom. Initial funding for the Centre came from Nigel Doughty a Cranfield MBA alumnus.

== Focus ==
The research focus of the centre was on how businesses embed Corporate Responsibility and the Enabling Environment encouraging more Corporate Responsibility in different varieties of capitalism and political systems and cultures.

The Centre focuses on three things:

1. knowledge creation: rigorous and relevant research into how companies can embed responsible business into the way they do business;
2. knowledge dissemination: introducing corporate responsibility more systemically into existing graduate and executive education; and
3. knowledge application: working with alumni, corporate partners and others to implement CR knowledge and learning.

== Leadership ==
The first director of the Doughty Centre was Prof David Grayson CBE, a long-time campaigner for Corporate Responsibility. Visiting professors include sustainability expert John Elkington. The centre's advisory council is chaired by Lord Stevenson of Coddenham, chairman of HBOS.
