= Cranfield School of Management =

Business school of Cranfield University, UK

Coordinates: 52.074°N 0.629°W

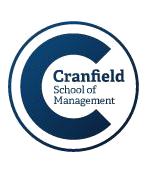
- Type: Business School
- Established: 1967; 59 years ago
- Dean: David Oglethorpe
- Location: Cranfield, United Kingdom
- Website: www.cranfield.ac.uk/som

Cranfield School of Management, established in 1967, is a business school that is part of Cranfield University in Bedfordshire, United Kingdom. Cranfield School of Management is triple accredited by the Association of MBAs (AMBA), EQUIS and AACSB.

== Campus ==
The Cranfield University campus, which includes the School of Management, is located just outside the village of Cranfield in the Bedfordshire countryside, near Milton Keynes.

The School's Management Information Resource Centre offers access to electronic resources and is equipped with a Bloomberg Suite, a series of terminals offering access to live financial services news and data on industries, markets, economic indicators, equities, bonds and derivatives. The school also has a purpose-built residential management training centre.

The Cranfield School of Management and the Defence College of Management and Technology at Shrivenham deliver the MBA (Defence), formerly Master of Defence Administration (MDA), at the Defence Academy of the United Kingdom Shrivenham campus.

== History ==
- 1937: RAF Cranfield was set up near Cranfield village in Bedfordshire in 1937 in the build-up to the Second World War.
- 1946: the airbase became the site of a College of Aeronautics to provide education and training for aeronautical engineers. Aspects of management were a feature of Cranfield programmes from the late 1940s.
- 1953: the Work Study School, which evolved to become Cranfield School of Management, opened.
- 1964: Origins of course that became the Cranfield MBA
- 1967: Cranfield School of Management was founded.
- 1968: Cranfield MBA launched
- 1969: Cranfield was awarded a Royal Charter giving it university status and the power to confer degrees under the new name of Cranfield Institute of Technology.
- 1993: Cranfield Institute of Technology changed its name to Cranfield University.
- 2001: Cranfield SoM gained Triple accreditation, one of the first few to do so in the UK.

== Rankings ==
The Cranfield School of Management is highly ranked globally as well as nationally. Many Cranfield academics have published textbooks used in other universities globally, including Paul Baines, Cliff Bowman, Annmarie Hanlon, Malcolm MacDonald, Stan Maklan and Javier Marcos-Cuevas.

As an exclusively postgraduate university, the University is excluded from the Times Higher Education World Rankings, The Times World Rankings, The Complete University Guide and The Guardian, which focus on helping prospective undergraduate students to compare universities.

Full-time MBA ranking

- The Financial Times 2019 ranking of full-time MBA programmes, ranked 9th in the UK, 18th in Europe and 76th in the world.
- The Bloomberg Businessweek European Best B-Schools ranking of full-time MBA programmes 2019-20, ranked 16th in Europe overall, 2nd in Europe for the learning experience, 7th in Europe for networking and 9th in Europe for entrepreneurship.
- The Economist Which MBA? Rankings 2019, ranked 5th in the UK, 14th in Europe and 59th in the world.
- The QS Global MBA Rankings 2021 ranked 9th in the UK, 29th in Europe and 79th in the world.

Executive MBA ranking

- The Financial Times ranking of Executive MBA programmes 2020, ranked 8th in the UK, 88th in the world, 3rd in the UK for Percentage of Women Students, 13th in the EU for Salary Increase Percentage and 1st in the UK for Satisfaction Rate.

Management MSc ranking

- The Economist Which MBA? Masters in Management (MiM) 2019 ranking, ranked 3rd in the UK and 30th in the world.
- The Financial Times: Masters In Management 2020, ranked 9th in the UK and 78th in the world.
- The QS World University Rankings: Masters in Management ranking 2021, ranked 6th in the UK, 26th in the world and 14th in the world for employability.

Finance and Management MSc ranking

- The Financial Times Masters in Finance Pre-experience ranking 2018, ranked 6th in the UK and 32nd in the world.
- The QS World University Rankings: Masters in Finance Rankings 2021, ranked 9th in the UK and 40th in the world.

Logistics and Supply Chain Management MSc ranking

- The QS World University Rankings: Masters in Supply Chain Management Rankings 2021, ranked 2nd in the UK and 11th in the world.

Strategic Marketing MSc ranking

- The QS World University Rankings: Masters in Marketing Rankings 2021, ranked 5th in the UK and 16th in the world.

Executive Education ranking

- The Executive Education 2020 FT Rankings, ranked top 10 in the UK, top 30 in Europe and top 40 in the world.

== International links ==
Cranfield School of Management has Memoranda of Understanding with:

- Darden Graduate School of Business Administration, University of Virginia, USA
- China Europe International Business School, Shanghai
- Indian Institute of Management, Bangalore, India
- Melbourne Business School, Australia
- Stellenbosch University, South Africa
- Fundação Getúlio Vargas, São Paulo, Brazil
- University of Chile
- Kobe University, Japan
- Nanyang Technological University, Singapore
- IPADE, Mexico.

The School of Management has run programmes with and hosted exchange students from a number of business schools around the world including ESADE, Spain, EM Lyon, France, University of Cape Town, South Africa and University of Ghana, Accra, Ghana.

== Notable alumni ==
The alumni body of Cranfield School of Management is an international network of professional managers from business, the professions, the public and not-for-profit sectors. Currently, the network includes more than 18,000 professional managers in over 120 countries.

Cranfield University are in the top 1% of institutions in the world for alumni who hold CEO positions at the world's top companies according to the Centre for World University Rankings, 2017.

- Nick Jenkins – Founder of online greetings card retailer Moonpig, former "dragon" on the BBC Two business series Dragons' Den.
- Karan Bilimoria – Founder and Chairman, Cobra Beer Ltd
- Crispin Blunt – Member of Parliament for Reigate.
- Andy Bond – Former CEO, Asda.
- Warren East – CEO, Rolls-Royce Holdings.
- Andy Palmer – Former CEO, Aston Martin.
- Andy Harrison – Chairman, Dunelm Group.
- John Hull – Professor of Derivatives and Risk Management at the University of Toronto.
- Antony Jenkins – former Group Chief Executive, Barclays.
- Martin Lamb – Former Chief Executive, IMI plc.
- Charlie Mayfield – Former Chairman, John Lewis Partnership.
- John McFarlane – Former Group Chairman, Barclays
- Lara Morgan – Entrepreneur and Investor, Company Shortcuts.
- Ted Tuppen – Founder and former CEO, Enterprise Inns Plc.
- Sarah Willingham – letssavesomemoney.com, former "dragon" on the BBC Two business series Dragons' Den.
- Akinwunmi Ambode – Former Governor Lagos State, Nigeria.
- Juan Rafael Elvira Quesada – Served as Secretary of the Environment and Natural Resources.
- Nigel Doughty – Former co-chairman and co-founder, Doughty Hanson & Co.
- Siddhartha Lal – Chief executive officer and Managing Director, Eicher Motors, and Chairman & Managing Director of VE Commercial Vehicles.
- Michael Bear (Lord Mayor) – The 683rd Lord Mayor of London.
- Samer Majali – Former CEO, Royal Jordanian airlines and SaudiGulf Airlines.
- Winnie Byanyima – Executive Director, UNAIDS.
- Clifford Braimah – Managing Director, Ghana Water Company Limited.
- Omobola Johnson – Senior Partner, TLcom Capital LLP.
- Riz Lateef – Journalist and newsreader, BBC.
