= Expatica =

Online news and information portal

- Website type: News website
- Available in: English
- Owner: Expatica Communications
- Website: https://www.expatica.com/
- Commercial: Yes
- Launched: 2000; 26 years ago

Expatica is an online information portal that serves English-speaking expatriates and the international community.

The website features articles and how-to guides covering various aspects of expat life, including education, finance, tax, relocation, and immigration.

It was founded in 2000 by Canadian Bram Lebo and Dutchman Mark Welling.

== Overview ==
Expatica's stated mission is to help expats in Europe settle into their new country of residence by providing up-to-date news and information in the English language.

The company's founding was partially funded by the Dutch government (the Twinning Center under the Ministry of Economic Affairs). Expatica services expats in countries including the Netherlands, Belgium, France, Germany, Spain, Switzerland, Luxembourg, the UK, Portugal, South Africa and Japan.

Expatica hosted an annual "I am not a tourist" fair in Amsterdam, Brussels and Madrid, along with regular meet-ups and social events.

Expatica assists academic institutions and independent researchers in carrying out research on expat-related subjects. To date, various surveys have been conducted in co-operation with Expatica, including an investigation into expatriation by Cranfield School of Management.
