= Photobox =

Online photo printing company

- Company type: Private
- Founded: 2000; 26 years ago
- No. of locations: London and Paris
- Founders: Graham Hobson and Mark Chapman
- Managing director: Dan Mucha
- Industry: Online photo printing
- Products: Prints, Canvas, Photo books, Cards, Magnets, Invitations
- Revenue: £175.3m 18.8% ▲
- Employees: circa 700
- Website: www.photobox.co.uk
- Users: 30 million+

Photobox is an online photo printing company, founded in 2000 by Graham Hobson. It has offices in London and Paris and operates over 10 countries, primarily in Europe.

== Business ==
In January 2000, Graham Hobson founded Photobox with his friend Mark Chapman. In 2006, the company merged with its French counterpart, Photoways and Stan Laurent became its head. In 2007, Photobox launched a dedicated German website. In 2010, expanded to Norway and Poland.

In July 2011, Photobox acquired the personalised card company Moonpig, forming the Photobox Group, which owns five brands: Photobox, Hofmann, posterXXL, Moonpig, and Greetz.
