= Haslina Taib =

Bruenian businessperson

- Born: Haslina; Brunei
- Education: Harvard University (MBA); Cranfield University
- Occupation: Businessperson
- Children: Haris Walker, Mayamin Walker
- Awards: See here

Haslina Taib is a Bruneian businesswoman whom is the Chief Executive Officer of Dynamik Technologies, an IT company based in Brunei Darussalam, since April 2007. Haslina is also known for serving as the Chair of the ASEAN Business Advisory Council (ASEAN BAC). Prior to holding this position, she was also appointed as Council member for the APEC Business Advisory Council (2010–2016).

== Education ==
Haslina holds Masters in Business Administration from Harvard University and Cranfield University. She is also a Fellow Member of the Association of Chartered Certified Accountants.

== Career ==
Prior to joining Dynamik Technologies, Haslina was involved with companies such as KPMG, Panel Kerr Foster, Andersen, WPP, Hill Knowlton Europe, and the Dorchester Group of Companies in Europe and North America.

=== Dynamik Technologies ===
Under Dynamik Technologies, Haslina has led the delivery of several national digital transformation projects, and introduced AKREDI, an ASEAN Digital Credentials Platform, and advocated emerging technologies such as fintech, blockchain, and low code in Brunei Darussalam. In addition, Haslina has been actively involved in growing the nation’s ICT industry through skill training in the private sectors, developing industry-ready graduates, and encouraging STEM education in youths with programmes such as “Kids Can Code”.

=== Other ventures ===
Haslina represented Brunei as Chair of the ASEAN Business and Investment Summit 2021 as a member of the ASEAN Business Advisory Council.

She is also a member of the Universiti Brunei Darussalam Council, the Brunei Darussalam Accounting Standards Council, and Chair of ASEAN Digital Transformation Working Group.

== Recognition and awards ==
- Brunei Women’s Forum Women Achievers in Corporate Sectors Award (2010)
- Outstanding Entrepreneur Awards for Asia Pacific Enterprise Awards (2010)
- 50 of Brunei’s Most Influential Women Brunei by Inspire (2014)
- Brunei’s 50 Most Inspiring LinkedIn Icons (2021)
- Asia’s Women Leader (August 2022)
- Cambodia Special Award (November 2022)
- Asia’s Most Inspiring Executive (2022)
