= Nigel Quinn =

American Engineer and Scientist

Nigel William Trevelyan Quinn
- Born: December 28, 1955 (age 70)
- Education: BSc (Hons)., Agricultural/Irrigation Engineering; MS., Agricultural and Civil Engineering; PhD., Water Resources Systems Engineering
- Alma mater: Cranfield University; Iowa State University; Cornell University
- Occupations: Water resources engineer, earth scientist and academic
- Scientific career
- Institutions: Lawrence Berkeley National Laboratory; US Bureau of Reclamation; University of California, Merced; California State University, Fresno; University of California, Berkeley

Nigel William Trevelyan Quinn is a water resources engineer, earth scientist and academic who is most known for introducing the concept of real-time water quality management in the 1990s. He has been a Research Group Leader of the HydroEcological Engineering Advanced Decision Support group during his career at Berkeley National Laboratory and has held academic appointments at the University of California, Merced, University of California, Berkeley and California State University, Fresno. He has had a 38-year association with the US Bureau of Reclamation Divisions of Planning and Resource Management that is ongoing.

== Early life ==
Quinn was born on December 28, 1955. He attended Milton and Churchill Schools in Zimbabwe. Subsequently, he worked for 11 months as a research technician with the Department of Conservation and Extension in Harare, Zimbabwe, developing and field-testing a tractor-mounted pyrethrum harvester and working in the laboratory on a rapid method for sediment estimation from soil erosion research plots, which was published in the Rhodesian Journal of Agricultural Research.

== Education and early career ==
Quinn graduated with a BSc (Hons) in Agricultural/Irrigation Engineering from Cranfield University in 1977, performing research on the mechanics of footpath erosion, which was later published in the Journal of Environmental Management with co-authors Roy Morgan and Alan Smith. After graduation, he worked as an Irrigation Engineer for Farrow Irrigation, a subsidiary of the Tate and Lyle Corporation. In 1978, he accepted a teaching and research appointment at Iowa State University in the US, later joining the faculty as an Instructor. He graduated with an MS in Agricultural and Civil Engineering, having researched intercepted rainfall throughfall erosivity under various crop canopy architectures, suggesting the inclusion of a canopy subfactor in the Universal Soil Loss Equation; this research was published in the Journal of Agricultural Engineering in 1981. In 1981, he enrolled in a PhD program at Cornell University, serving as a General Electric Fellow with the Department of Civil and Environmental Engineering, and received a PhD in Water Resources Systems Engineering in 1987 under the mentorship of Walter Lynn. He conducted research on a systems approach to selenium drainage management in the San Joaquin Valley of California.

== Career ==
In 1990, he was recruited by the Lawrence Berkeley National Laboratory and Sally Benson, who was leading her own research program on surface and groundwater selenium containment at the Kesterson Reservoir. The Rainbow Report, to which he contributed, provided a long-term solution roadmap for selenium contamination in the San Joaquin Valley, sparking a 38-year scientific research endeavor in this field. Success on an EPA-STAR grant led to his work on climate change impacts, integrating hydrologic, water quality, and economic models, resulting in several publications and an associate faculty position at UC Berkeley. In 2000, he founded the HydroEcological Engineering Advanced Decision Support Group (HEADS) and absorbed emeritus Professor Bill Oswald's research group, focusing on algae-based cultivation and bioremediation amid growing interest in algae biofuels. His technoeconomic assessment of algae biofuel potential, funded by the Energy Biosciences Institute at UC Berkeley, has been highly cited and contributed to Tryg Lundquist's prominence in algae biofuel technology.

== Contributions ==
After the SJVDP in 1990, Quinn formed a long-term association with Alex Hildebrand (1913–2012), a farmer and CALFED Bay-Delta Advisory Committee governor appointee, sharing ideas on the concept of real-time water quality management, primarily salinity, in the San Joaquin River. He became an advocate and technical proponent of this concept, securing initial grant funding to explore it with the Department of Water Resources, Regional Water Quality Control Board, US Bureau of Reclamation, and US Geological Survey. The real-time water quality management concept was embraced by major state and federal water agencies, endorsed through California state legislation, and enshrined in the San Joaquin Basin Water Quality Control Plan. This advocacy and development resulted in over 30 research publications and book chapters. His early adoption of sensor networks and web-based information dissemination was followed by several water districts and agencies, particularly the Grassland Water District. The WARMF salinity forecasting model originated from his and his colleagues' decision to promote a watershed approach to salinity forecasting, incorporating continuous flow and salinity data into real-time forecasting, enhancing the acceptance of WARMF and similar decision support tools.

== Personal life ==
Quinn has been a lifelong equestrian and polo player. He was affiliated with the Los Altos Hounds hunt, and co-managed the Wine County Polo Club for 3 years between 2014 and 2017. Additionally, he has been a member of the US Polo Association for over 30 years and a member of the Yolo Polo Club, Sutter Buttes Polo Club, Wine Country Polo Club, Cerro Pampa Polo Club and the Tierra Tropical Polo Club in San Pancho, Mexico. He has been a member of the Manorial Society of Great Britain and acquired the ancient feudal title of Lord of the Manor of Hurstpierpoint in West Sussex, England.

== Awards and honors ==
- 2006 – Fellow, International Symposium for Environmental Software Systems
- 2007 – Diplomate, American Academy for Water Resources Engineers D.WRE
- 2010 – Fellow, International Environmental Modelling and Software Society
- 2013 – Hugo B. Fischer Award, California Water and Environmental Modeling Forum
- 2014 – Distinguished Service Award, California Water and Environmental Modeling Forum
- 2015 – Fellow, American Society of Civil Engineers
- 2018 – Fellow, American Society of Civil Engineers, Environmental Water Resources Institute
- 2020 – Life Member Award, American Society of Civil Engineers

== Selected articles ==
- Elwell, H. A., & Quinn, N. (1975). A rapid method for estimating the dry mass of soil from erosion research plots. Rhodesian Journal of Agricultural Research, 13, 149–154.
- Quinn, N.W.T., Morgan, R. P. C., & Smith, A. J. (1980). Simulation of soil erosion induced by human trampling. Journal of Environmental Management, 10, 155–165.
- Quinn, N. W., & Laflen, J. M. (1983). Characteristics of raindrop throughfall under corn canopy. Transactions of the ASAE, 26(5), 1445.
- Quinn, N., Grober, L., Kipps, J., Chen, C., & Cummings, E. (1997). Computer model improves real-time management of water quality. California Agriculture, 51(5), 14–20.
- Quinn, N. W. T., McGahan, J., & Delamore, M. (1998). Innovative drainage management techniques to meet monthly and annual selenium load targets. California Agriculture, 52(5), 1998.
- Quinn, N.W.T., & Karkoski, J. 1998. Potential for real time management of water quality in the San Joaquin Basin, California. Journal of the American Water Resources Association, 36(6).
- Quinn, N. W., Miller, N. L., Dracup, J. A., Brekke, L., & Grober, L. F. (2001). An integrated modeling system for environmental impact analysis of climate variability and extreme weather events in the San Joaquin Basin, California. Advances in Environmental Research, 5(4), 309–317.
- Quinn, N. W. T., & Hanna, W. M. (2002). Real-time adaptive management of seasonal wetlands to improve water quality in the San Joaquin River. Adv. Environ. Res, 5(4), 309–317.
- Quinn, N. W., Brekke, L. D., Miller, N. L., Heinzer, T., Hidalgo, H., & Dracup, J. A. (2004). Model integration for assessing future hydroclimate impacts on water resources, agricultural production and environmental quality in the San Joaquin Basin, California. Environmental Modelling & Software, 19(3), 305–316.
- Quinn, N. W., & Hanna, W. M. (2003). A decision support system for adaptive real-time management of seasonal wetlands in California. Environmental Modelling & Software, 18(6), 503–511.
