= Lara Morgan =

British entrepreneur

Lara Morgan is a British entrepreneur and the founder and former CEO of Pacific Direct. Having sold her share in Pacific Direct, she is now involved in several UK startups.

== Background ==
Born in Germany as her parents were in the military, she was sent back to Scotland to receive her education. Morgan had not completed her A-levels when her father became bankrupt and she moved to Hong Kong to find work. She lived and worked in Hong Kong, the Gulf and New Zealand before moving to the UK at the age of 23, where she started Pacific Direct as a sole trader. Her grandmother was her strategic adviser and told Morgan to approach the Dorchester Hotel, to sell her miniature sewing kits and shower caps. Over the course of twenty years, the company grew to become a manufacturer and supplier of luxury branded toiletries and guest amenities to hotels, cruise lines and airlines. It has been at the forefront licensing leading toiletries and cosmetics brands for the hotel industry. Pacific Direct now has manufacturing plants in the Czech Republic as well as in China It has eight offices around the world and has customers in more than 110 countries worldwide.

In 2008 Lara sold her 99% share in Pacific Direct for £20 million.

== Organisations ==
She is a founder member of the Young Entrepreneurs Organisation, now EO, was a finalist in the Veuve Clicquot Businesswoman of the Year Award, and has also been a three times finalist in the Ernst and Young Entrepreneur of the Year.

In 1999, Lara completed Cranfield’s Business Growth and Development Programme, the UK’s leading programme for ambitious owner managers. She was named Cranfield Entrepreneur Alumnus of the Year in 2009.

Having sold her company, Lara set up Company Shortcuts, an online platform for entrepreneurs to increase their effectiveness and accelerate growth. She is a judge with Robert Craven for the UK Startup Awards 2011.

In October 2013, Lara Morgan joined the board of Manchester SME Clothes2Order, having met the company's Managing Director Michael Conway through a business networking organisation. She later agreed to join the board of the Trafford Park-based manufacturer.

== Personal life ==
Morgan has three daughters, and is an ex top ten world triathlete.

== Speaking ==
She also regularly speaks at events and conferences about her experiences and achievements, giving no-nonsense advice to business owners and entrepreneurs. She is a regular commentator on current affairs and business issues with Sky News and BBC News. She has also appeared on the BBC2 show "The Apprentice: You're Fired."

She is also an elite triathlete, having competed in the 2011 World Triathlon Championships in Beijing, achieving 10th place.

== Works ==
- More Balls Than Most: Juggle your way to success with proven company shortcuts (2011) ISBN 978-1-906821-73-9
