= Andy Bond (businessman) =

British businessman

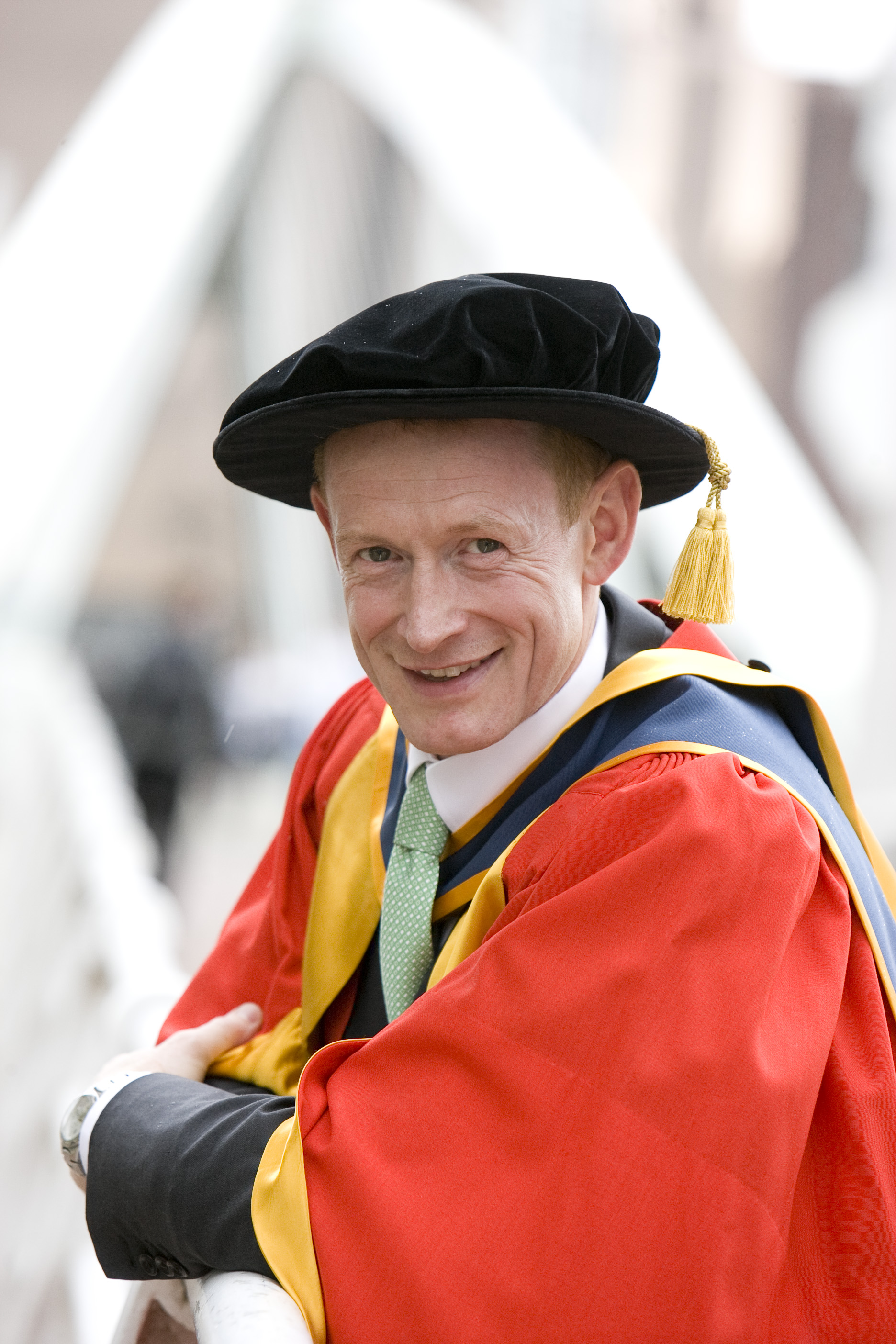
- Andy Bond receiving his honorary degree from the University of Salford in July 2009
- Born: Andrew James Bond; 16 March 1965 (age 60)

Andrew James Bond (born 16 March 1965) is a former chief executive officer of Asda having resigned in April 2010.

== Early life ==
Bond's father was a plumber and his mother a nurse. He was born in Grantham, and attended The King's School, Grantham and gained four A levels. He received a first-class BEng Hons in Gas Engineering from the University of Salford in 1987 as part of a British Gas plc scholarship spending a year on the job in the gas industry.

== Career ==
He started his career as a graduate trainee engineer with British Gas. In 1988, he worked for Manchester-based Hopkinsons Group, one of British Gas's suppliers, as a marketing manager. In 1992–1993, he studied for an MBA at Cranfield School of Management.

He began at ASDA as a marketing manager for Archie Norman, when aged 29 in April 1994, having been top of his course at Cranfield. He was noted for his determination and eye for detail. At ASDA, he worked under Allan Leighton and with Justin King. In 1998, he became corporate marketing director, then in 1999, he became European own-label director. In November 2000, he headed the George clothing brand of ASDA (worth about £1bn a year on its own in the UK, and based near Lutterworth), working with designer Kate Bostock, after the potentially-damaging departure of George Davies. He became chief operating officer of ASDA in September 2004, then CEO in March 2005, resigning this position in April 2010.

== Personal life ==
He married Susan Stringfellow in April 1997 in North Yorkshire. They live in Harrogate with their son (born 1998) and daughter (born 1999), having formerly lived in Bitteswell. He is keen on personal fitness.

== Video clips ==
- April 2007 interview on BBC Breakfast
