= Nigel Doughty =

British businessman (1957–2012)

Nigel Edward Doughty
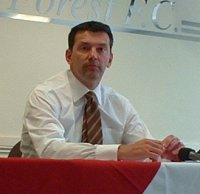
- Born: 10 June 1957; Newark-on-Trent, Nottinghamshire, United Kingdom
- Died: 4 February 2012 (aged 54); Skillington, Lincolnshire, England
- Education: Cranfield School of Management
- Occupation: Investor
- Known for: Former controlling owner of Nottingham Forest F.C.
- Spouse: Carol Green (m. 1985; div. 1997) Lucy Vasquez (m. 2004)
- Children: 4, including Michael Doughty (English footballer)

Nigel Edward Doughty (10 June 1957 – 4 February 2012) was a British investor and football club owner, who was co-chairman and co-founder of Doughty Hanson & Co, a European private equity firm based in London.

== Early life and education ==
Doughty was born in Newark, Nottinghamshire. Doughty completed his Cranfield MBA in 1984 and became a Distinguished Alumnus of the Cranfield School of Management in 2004.

== Career ==
The European private equity firm based in London, Doughty Hanson & Co traces its history back to 1985 when Doughty and Richard Hanson began working together on European investments.

== Other interests ==
=== Politics ===
Around 2010, Doughty was an Assistant Treasurer of the Labour Party and Chairman of the Small Business Taskforce policy review. He was a member of the World Economic Forum in Davos.

=== Football ===
Doughty bought control of Nottingham Forest F.C. for £11 million in 1999. After the departure of Steve McClaren as Forest manager in October 2011, Doughty announced his decision to step down as Forest chairman by the end of the 2011–12 season. Doughty's son Michael is a professional footballer.

=== Philanthropy ===
He made a personal donation in 2006 to establish the Doughty Centre for Corporate Responsibility at Cranfield School of Management. He was also President of The Cranfield Trust.

Doughty was a Trustee of the Doughty Family Foundation and the Doughty Hanson Charitable Foundation.

== Death ==
On 4 February 2012, Doughty was found dead in the gymnasium of his home in Skillington, Lincolnshire. His death was due to Sudden Arrhythmic Death Syndrome (SADS).
