= Fellowship in Manufacturing Management =

Fellowship program

The Fellowship in Manufacturing Management (FMM) is a programme designed for strategic-level managers with careers in manufacturing industry. The award-winning course is held over 15 months and is based at the School of Applied Sciences, part of Cranfield University in Bedfordshire, England. Fellows become full graduate members, namely alumni, of the university.

== Course details ==
The course objective is to improve cost effectiveness in industry. The approach features accelerated development through a combination of residential study. This is followed by 12 months of practical, work-based achievement with the aim of developing talented professional managers able to deal with change. The course has a substantial impact on the careers and personal development of its alumni. It also provides significant productivity improvements to its industry partners and thereby makes a valuable contribution to the UK's manufacturing competitiveness.

There is an initial foundation phase of 12 weeks study at the university followed the 12 month industrial phase. The foundation phase covers professional skills for manufacturing management including Lean Manufacturing tools, Six Sigma, theory of constraints, Change Management and Finance and Strategy. It also emphasises the personal skills of Leadership, Communication, Problem Solving, Decision Making, Self-Management and Personal Effectiveness. Fellows put all of these skills to use during the Industrial Phase, on a challenging manufacturing or operations management assignment.

Fellows become members of a supportive discussion forum for over 1,200 fellow alumni.

== Queen's Anniversary Prize ==
The FMM was awarded the Queen's Anniversary Prize for Higher and Further Education in 2005. The citation observed the FMM is a 'unique and innovative' programme that is 'designed for strategic-level managers' and 'provides accelerated training to develop talented professionals as effective change managers'.

== History ==
The FMM's first intake started in 1977 and was funded by the Engineering Industry Training board (EITB).
