= Clifford Braimah =

Ghanaian engineer, academic and politician

MD Ghana Water Company Ltd
- Incumbent
- Assumed office March 2017
- President: Nana Akuffo-Addo

Personal details
- Born: Ghana
- Party: New Patriotic Party
- Education: KNUST, Cranfield University
- Occupation: Lecturer
- Profession: Engineer

Clifford Braimah is a Ghanaian engineer, academic and politician. He is a member of the New Patriotic Party (NPP) of Ghana and has served as the Northern Regional secretary of the party. He served as the Dean of the Department of Engineering of the Tamale Technical University. He is currently the managing director of the Ghana Water Company Limited. In 2018, he received the Humanity Magazine International Award for his efforts to improve Ghanaian drinking water quality.

== Early life and education ==
Clifford Braimah was admitted to the College of Engineering of the Kwame Nkrumah University of Science and Technology where he graduated after his four-year education with a BSc in engineering. He obtained an MSc degree in Environmental Resources Management from the same university. He holds a PhD in Water Management from Cranfield University, United Kingdom.

== Working life ==
Braimah joined the Tamale Technical University as a faculty member of the School of Engineering in the year 2000. He was appointed a senior lecturer at the institution in 2011. While a faculty member, he contributed to several aspects of water development policies for both regional and national programs. These include the Savelugu Water System and the training of system operators in thirty towns within the northern sector of Ghana. He was a lead facilitator for the training of all 216 district water management engineers of Ghana. Clifford Braimah is a member of the Ghana Institute of Engineers and the International Water Association. He was appointed the Dean of the School of Engineering of Tamale Technical University.

== Political life ==
From 2006 to 2014, Braimah served as the Northern Regional secretary of the New Patriotic Party. He has been described by Arthur Kobina Kennedy as "the go-to guy" in the Northern Region during the 2008 campaign. When the NPP won the 2016 general elections, he was tapped to be named the Northern Regional Minister. The position was given to a former District Chief Executive for Nanumba North District, Salifu Saeed. It later emerged that the then-NPP regional chairman Daniel Bugri Naabu felt he could not work with Clifford due to individual differences. In March 2017, Joseph Kofi Adda, Minister for Water and Sanitation, appointed Braimah to head the national water supplier, Ghana Water Company Limited.

== Managing director of Ghana Water ==
After his appointment, some workers of the company were unhappy with the sector minister as they believed the position should to have gone to a company insider. Some believed he did not know enough about the internal workings of the company and as such believed he would fail at his job. Other staff members were excited as they hoped that an outsider who had no alliance with staff groups would be the best person to steer to company forward. This view was largely supported by the workers union. Braimah has stated that by the end of his term Ghana Water would be a world class water supply company.

As managing director of the national water supplier, Clifford Braimah has undertaken several projects to improve water delivery to all parts of the country. He oversaw an increase of water production from the Tono Irrigation Dam which had been in existence since 1975. The dam now supplies water to several parts of the Upper East Region. He has proposed plans to construct a calcium hypochlorite factory to locally produce chemicals needed to disinfect the water. According to Braimah, the factory when completed will reduce the cost of water purification and supply.

=== Opposition to galamseyers ===
In March 2018, Briamah made a national call for Ghanaians to support the joint police-military task force known as Operation Vanguard. The call was due to the activities of illegal gold miners known as galamseyers. The pollution of water bodies from their activities caused an increase in production costs for the Ghana Water Company. The increase in cost was due to the extra cost of aluminium sulphate needed to treat water from the polluted water bodies.

== Awards ==
- 2018, Award, Humanity Magazine International, "With respect to his effort for the transformation of the Ghana Water Company an enviable achievement towards the provision of quality drinking water to Ghanaians, including the protection of the water bodies, which is essential for economic and social development."

Political offices
Preceded by ?	Ghana; 2017 -	Incumbent
