= Nick Jenkins =

English businessman (born 1967)

- Born: 13 May 1967 (age 58); Droitwich Spa, Worcestershire, England
- Education: Haberdashers' Adams Grammar
- Alma mater: University of Birmingham (BA); Cranfield University (MBA)
- Occupation(s): Businessman; Television personality
- Known for: Dragons' Den & founder of Moonpig
- Children: 1

Nicholas David Jenkins (born 13 May 1967) is a British businessman, best known for founding the online greeting card retailer Moonpig.com, then as a "dragon" for the BBC Two TV business series Dragons' Den in the thirteenth and fourteenth series.

== Early life and education ==
Born at Droitwich Spa, Worcestershire, Jenkins was educated at Haberdashers' Adams Grammar School, before going up to Birmingham University. He pursued further studies at Cranfield University, graduating as MBA.

== Career ==
Jenkins launched the greeting card business Moonpig in 2000; 'Moonpig' alluding to his nickname at school, hence the name of the brand. In 2011, he sold Moonpig for an estimated £120 million.

Since 2008, Jenkins has been investing in start-up businesses. He was a member of the Impact Ventures UK investment committee – an investment fund which invests in social enterprises using innovation to find better solutions to social issues in the UK. He is also involved with the educational charity ARK and Shivia.

A donor to the Conservative Party, he was a signatory to a letter to The Daily Telegraph during the 2015 United Kingdom general election campaign, which praised the party's economic policies and claimed that a future Labour government (under Ed Miliband) would "threaten jobs and deter investment".

Since 2014 Jenkins has owned Stockton House, a Grade I listed mansion in Wiltshire, and is a Liveryman of the Haberdashers' Company since 2018.
