= Confederation of Malagasy Workers =

National trade union center in Madagascar

FMM
- Confederation of Malagasy Workers
- Fivondronamben'ny Mpiasa Malagasy
- Founded: 1957
- Headquarters: Antananarivo, Madagascar
- Location: Madagascar
- Affiliations: ITUC

The Confederation of Malagasy Workers (FMM) is a national trade union center in Madagascar. It is affiliated with the International Trade Union Confederation.
