= Moonpig =

British online greeting card business

Moonpig Group PLC
- Type: Public
- Traded as: LSE: MOON
- Industry: Greeting cards
- Founded: 3 June 2000; 26 years ago
- Founder: Nick Jenkins
- Headquarters: London, England, United Kingdom
- Area served: United Kingdom
- Key people: Kate Swann (Chair); Nickyl Raithatha (CEO)
- Revenue: ▲£373.0 million (2026)
- Operating income: ▲£87.2 million (2026)
- Net income: ▲£51.7 million (2026)
- Website: moonpig.com

Moonpig Group plc is an internet-based business whose head offices are situated in London and Guernsey. The company's business model is mainly selling personalised greeting cards, flowers and gifts. It is listed on the London Stock Exchange and is a constituent of the FTSE 250 Index.

== History ==
According to founder Nick Jenkins, "Moonpig" was his nickname at school in Newport, Shropshire, hence the name of the brand.

The original launch of Moonpig in 2000 coincided with the collapse of the dot-com bubble, which made progress difficult at first, but Jenkins raised further investment from private investors and venture capital, and the advent of broadband and digital cameras together with news spreading by word-of-mouth meant sales steadily increased, with the first profits being made in 2005.

A television advertising campaign began in the United Kingdom in November 2006. two years and four months later, Moonpig received more internet traffic than other flower and gift companies in the UK. By summer 2009, the company had sold cards to 2.57 million customers and its profit record was seen by The Times as "a typical curve for a successful start-up – a big, £1 million loss establishing it in its first year, negligible losses edging into negligible earnings over the next six years, and thereafter a seven-figure profit".

The website was launched in July 2000, and in 2007 the company was responsible for 90 percent of the online greeting card market in the United Kingdom, with nearly six million cards shipped.

In July 2011, Moonpig was bought by Photobox Group, which also owns Photobox, for £120m in a cash and shares transaction. Photobox was sold to a private equity firm Exponent Private Equity in 2015.

In 2019 Moonpig separated from Photobox Group. Moonpig Group was formed which encompassed Moonpig and Dutch equivalent Greetz.

On 2 February 2021 Moonpig Group was listed on the London Stock Exchange; its market capitalisation at the end of the first day of trading was over £1.2billion. Exponent sold shares as part of the listing, cutting its stake from 41% to 27%.

== Security ==
In August 2013, a private developer discovered a vulnerability in the Moonpig API that made it possible for outsiders to retrieve the personal information of all three million of its users (names, birthdays, postal addresses, email addresses, phone numbers, the last four digits of credit card numbers, and credit card expiry dates), and informed Moonpig. Moonpig did nothing about it until the developer publicly announced the problem in January 2015, whereupon Moonpig disabled the API and its mobile apps pending an investigation. Moonpig issued a statement saying that "all password and payment information is and has always been safe".
