= Consumer protection in the United Kingdom =

Consumer protection in the United Kingdom is effected through a multiplicity of Acts of Parliament, statutory instruments, the work of various government agencies and departments, and citizens' lobby groups. It aims to ensure the market economy produces fairness and quality in the goods and services people buy. The main areas of regulating consumer affairs include:

- fairer terms in contracts for goods and services, by declaring surprising and onerous terms as unfair
- product safety regulation, to ensure people cannot purchase goods that are potentially harmful
- financial regulation, to ensure access to credit is cheaper, and people fully understand the obligations they have when taking loans
- stronger competition in the private sector, through breaking up cartels, dismantling monopolies, and unwinding some mergers.

== History ==
The Department of Prices and Consumer Protection was established in 1974. This was the first time a government department's title made reference to consumer protection.

In 2011 Consumer Minister Edward Davey announced plans within a policy document called Better Choices, Better Deals: Consumers Powering Growth to ensure that businesses would provide key information to their customers on how they use and buy goods and services, aiming to help consumers secure the best deals possible, and to make business more dynamic in response. The government considered this to offer "a radical new approach" to consumer empowerment.

The Financial Conduct Authority and the Competition and Markets Authority were both set up in 2013 and enforce many consumer laws and regulations in the United Kingdom across a variety of industries.

- The Financial Conduct Authority, formerly the Financial Services Authority.
- Competition and Markets Authority, formerly the Competition Commission and the Office of Fair Trading.
- Bank of England.

The Consumer Contracts (Information, Cancellation and Additional Charges) Regulations 2013 introduced a definition of the term "consumer" as "an individual acting for purposes which are wholly or mainly outside that individual's trade, business, craft or profession".

== Consumer advocacy groups ==
The Enterprise Act 2002 allows consumer bodies that have been approved by the Secretary of State for Trade and Industry to be designated as "super-complainants" to the Office of Fair Trading. These super-complainants are intended to "strengthen the voice of consumers", who are "unlikely to have access individually to the kind of information necessary to judge whether markets are failing for them". Eight have been designated as of 2007:

- CAMRA - a lobbying group concerned with the tradition and quality of beer.
- The Citizen's Advice Bureau, a free service that provides legal advice, practical help and information on consumer rights across the country.
- Consumer Council for Water (formerly known as Watervoice)
- Consumer Direct
- General Consumer Council of Northern Ireland
- Good Garage Scheme, an automobile repair shop motoring scheme
- National Consumer Council
- Postwatch
- Which? - formerly the Consumers Association - a consumer advocacy organisation which has substantial powers (for example to take representative actions under the Competition Act 1998) but which is primarily a lobbying organisation funded entirely by subscriptions to its regular consumer information magazine.

Fundraising - Charity fundraisers on the street or calling house-to-house are sometimes called 'chuggers' - a portmanteau of charity muggers. Some charity fundraisers have been shown to use intimidatory and aggressive tactics, violating rules set out by regulatory agencies.

- Public Fundraising Regulatory Association
- Fund Raising Standards Board

== Consumer laws and regulations ==
An early proposal to legislate on itinerant salesmen was put forward in a bill intended to regulate their conduct in 1965.

The Cancellation of Contracts made in a Consumer's Home or Place of Work Regulations 2008, also known as the "Doorstep Selling Regulations", were replaced by the Consumer Contracts (Information, Cancellation and Additional Charges) Regulations 2013.

Other applicable legislation includes:

- Consumer Credit Act 1974
- Unfair Contract Terms Act 1977
- Sale of Goods Act 1979
- Unfair Terms in Consumer Contract Regulations 1999
- Consumer Protection (Distance Selling) Regulations 2000 (replaced by the Consumer Contracts (Information, Cancellation and Additional Charges) Regulations 2013)
- Electronic Commerce Regulations 2002
- Consumer Protection from Unfair Trading Regulations 2008
- Consumer Rights (Payment Surcharges) Regulations 2012
- Unfair Contract Terms Bill
- Consumer Rights Act 2015 - in particular Part 2 (Unfair Terms), sections 61 - 69.

=== Product safety ===
- Consumer Protection Act 1987
- General Product Safety Regulations 2005

=== Finance and credit ===
- Consumer Credit Act 1974
- Financial Services and Markets Act 2000
- Financial Services Act 2010
- Financial Ombudsman Service

=== Competition law ===
- Competition Act 1998
- Enterprise Act 2002

== See also ==
- Cooling-off period (consumer rights)
- Consumer Direct
- UK company law
- Restraint of trade
- Bank of England, established 1694
- Trading Standards Institute, formerly the Incorporated Society of Inspectors of Weights and Measures est 1881
- European Communities Act 1972
- Department of Trade and Industry
