= Citizens Advice Scotland =

Network of citizens advice bureaux in Scotland

- Scottish Association of Citizens Advice Bureaux
- Formation: 1975 (autonomous); network since 1939
- Type: Charity
- Registration no.: SC016637 (Scottish charity); SC089892 (company)
- Headquarters: Broadside, 2 Powderhall Road, Edinburgh
- Region served: Scotland
- Chief executive: Derek Mitchell (since 2017)
- Revenue: £28.2 million (2024–25)
- Staff: 208 (2024–25)
- Website: www.cas.org.uk

Citizens Advice Scotland (CAS) is the network of citizens advice bureaux (Note: Bureaux is the plural of bureau. A citizens advice bureau (CAB) is a local, independent charity that gives free advice, and is part of the Citizens Advice network in Scotland.) in Scotland and the national charity that supports and represents them. The charity's legal name is the Scottish Association of Citizens Advice Bureaux (SACAB). Its roughly 60 member bureaux are independent local charities that give free, confidential and impartial advice on problems such as benefits, debt, housing, employment and consumer disputes.

Scotland's first bureaux opened in Glasgow at the start of the Second World War, as part of a UK-wide emergency service. Concern that a London-run organisation could not reflect Scotland's separate legal and educational systems led to an autonomous Scottish association in 1975, which became fully independent in 1980. Since then, the bureaux have helped with various pressures on household budgets in Scotland, from the arrival of the poll tax in 1989 to the welfare reforms of the 2010s and the energy price crisis of the 2020s.

Originally founded on volunteers, the service has grown steadily more professional. New advisers train for six months, and paid specialists now work alongside volunteers in most bureaux. The national charity has also taken on statutory roles: work that the law requires a named body to carry out.

== History ==
A widow of a civil servant seeks advice about her delayed pension from a volunteer at a Citizens' Advice Bureau, 1940.

=== Wartime origins (1939–1945) ===
Glasgow's Society of Social Service opened a volunteer-run bureau in Bath Street in January 1939, months before the Second World War broke out. It handled about 8,000 enquiries in its first year, and CAS describes it as the UK's first operational bureau. When war began that September, more than 200 bureaux opened across the UK to help people with the upheavals of war, from being bombed out to tracing relatives and replacing lost ration books. By 1942 more than 60 bureaux were running in Scotland, with over 700 volunteers.

The Clydebank Blitz in March 1941 left more than 11,000 people in rest centres. Glasgow's bureau sent 54 volunteers, some from as far as Edinburgh, to help bomb victims and evacuees find shelter at Glasgow Corporation's emergency centre.

=== Post-war years and independence (1945–1980) ===
The bureaux stayed open after the war as a permanent, mostly volunteer service. The new welfare state brought fresh demand, as people sought help with new services such as legal aid and the National Health Service.

William Beveridge, whose 1942 report had laid the foundations of the welfare state, wrote in 1948 that bureaux did more than help individuals: they helped build a more united community, and were "invaluable collectors of information about economic and social conditions".

Scottish bureaux were part of a UK service run from London, but because Scotland's legal and educational systems were separate, the information supplied from London did not always fit their needs. They formed their own association in 1975, which became fully independent in 1980.

=== Debt and the poll tax (1980s–1990s) ===
In the 1980s demand grew for help with employment and social security, and the spread of easy credit made debt the network's biggest single issue by the end of the decade. It remains one of the largest today.

The poll tax was introduced in Scotland in 1989, a year before the rest of Britain. Scottish bureaux recorded 46,000 enquiries about it in its first ten months, and the Scottish Office paid CAS to train bureau workers on it.

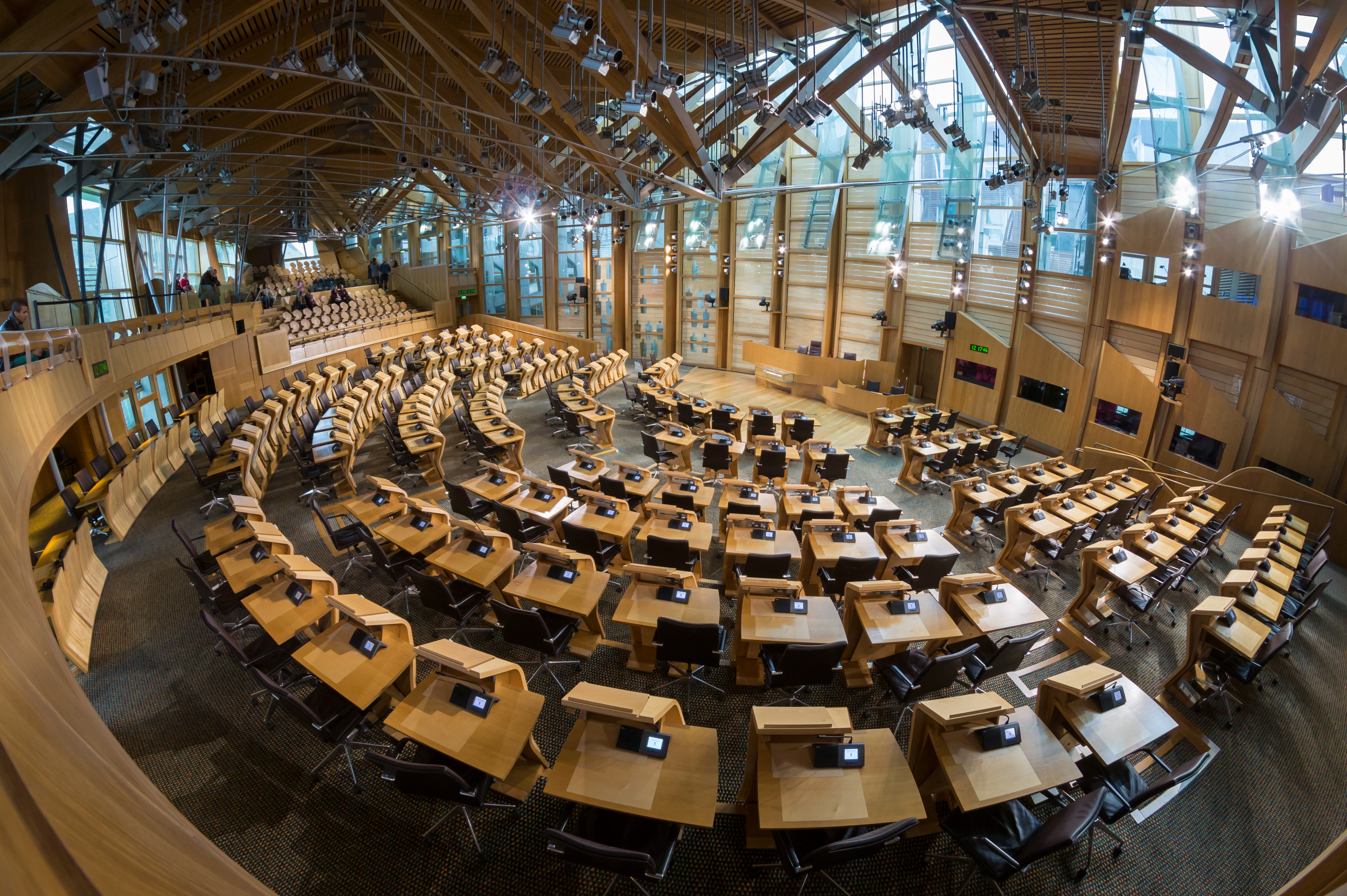
Scottish Parliament debating chamber

=== Devolution (1999 onwards) ===
The opening of the Scottish Parliament in 1999 meant that much of the law behind people's problems was now made in Edinburgh, and its powers grew over time. CAS directed more of its campaigning to Holyrood, and the advice bureaux gave increasingly had to reflect Scottish rules rather than British ones.

An early example was debt enforcement. Until 2001, sheriff officers could still seize and sell household goods for debts through poindings and warrant sales. After the new Scottish Parliament abolished them, it created a new way for people to repay their debts over time, the Debt Arrangement Scheme, which CAS had campaigned for. It opened in 2004.

From 2016 a large part of social security, mainly disability and carer benefits, was devolved. Scotland has since added new benefits of its own, and bureaux now advise on two benefit systems side by side.

=== Financial crisis and welfare reform (2008–2019) ===
In the years after the 2008 financial crisis, more of the people coming to bureaux were struggling with the cost of living. CAS's chief executive has linked this to the crisis itself, the austerity that followed, growing consumer debt, insecure work and the introduction of Universal Credit.

Welfare reform in the 2010s reshaped bureau work. A Scotsman feature on Glasgow's city-centre bureau described queues forming outside from 6.30 in the morning. Advisers spent much of their time appealing fit-for-work decisions, most of which the bureau won at tribunal. As Universal Credit rolled out, advice on it more than doubled in 2018–19, to almost 40,000 pieces of advice.

=== Pandemic and cost of living (2020 onwards) ===
With COVID-19 restrictions limiting face-to-face advice for much of 2020–21, bureaux moved to phone and online work, helping more than 171,000 people.

From 2022 rising energy prices made energy the network's biggest advice area after social security.

== Bureaux around Scotland ==
Each bureau's work reflects the local economy, geography and community it serves.

=== Glasgow and the west ===
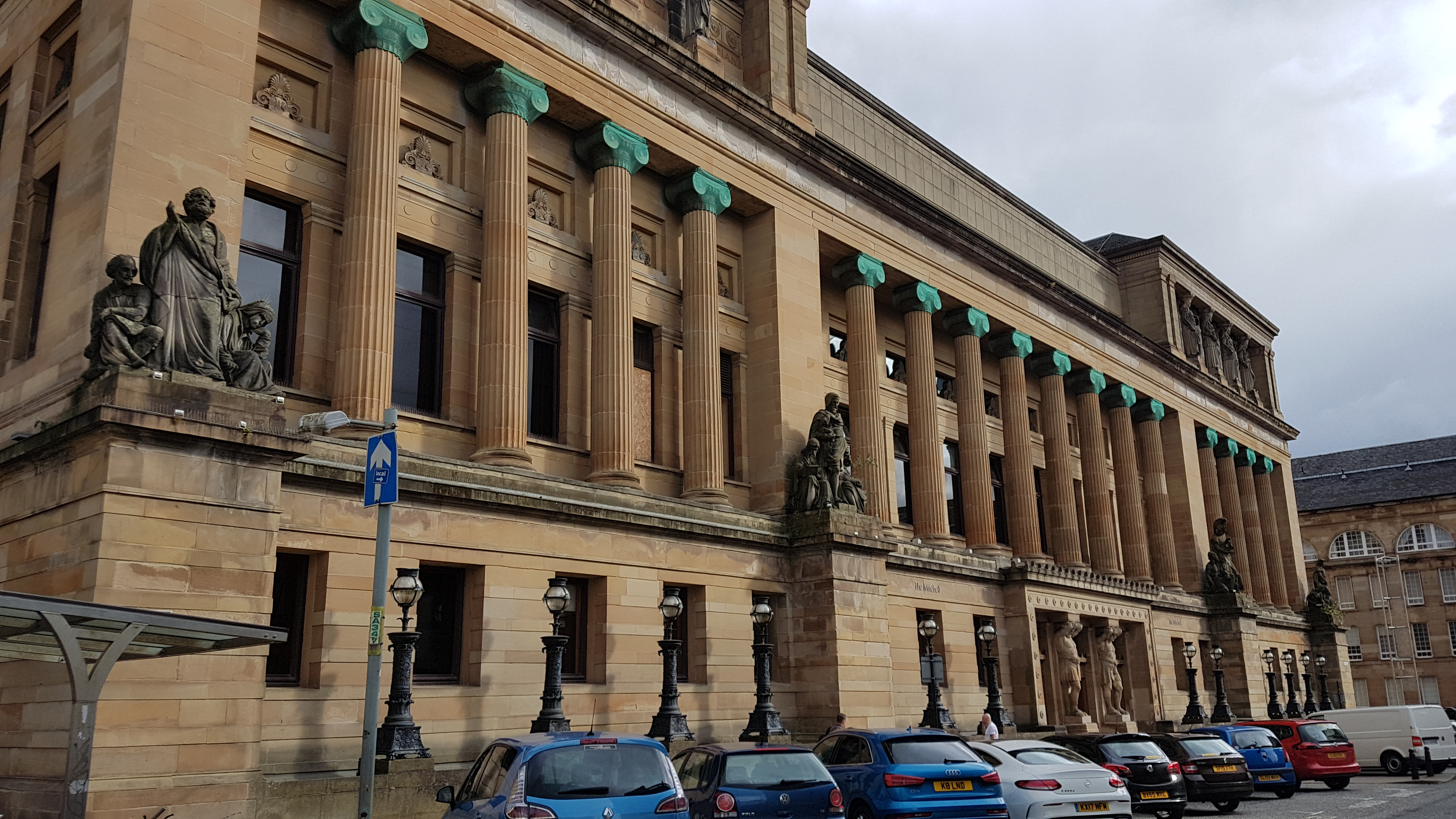
The Mitchell Library, home of Glasgow Central Citizens Advice Bureau

Glasgow's bureaux stretch from Drumchapel in the west to Easterhouse in the east, and the city-centre bureau now works from the Mitchell Library at Charing Cross. Since 2000 Glasgow has been Scotland's main dispersal city for people seeking asylum, and it is now home to most asylum seekers in Scotland, on top of a long legacy of deprivation. In the East End, Parkhead Citizens Advice Bureau offers interpretation and advice in a number of languages, and visits people at home when they cannot easily reach an office.

From 2010 the network ran the Armed Services Advice Project for veterans, serving personnel and their families, funded by military charities led by Poppyscotland; in its first decade it helped around 15,900 people. The national project has since closed, but in Lanarkshire, whose southern half alone is home to one of Scotland's larger veteran populations, Motherwell and Wishaw Citizens Advice Bureau still runs a specialist service, Lanarkshire Armed Services Advice.

Local funding can decide whether a bureau exists at all. Glasgow has twice come close to losing most of its bureaux. In 2012 CAS announced the closure of five after losing a council tender to run advice services in the city, until a local consortium stepped in. In 2020 five of the city's eight bureaux were passed over by the council's new Communities Fund, and were saved only by a transition fund that still cut their funding by around 30%. North Ayrshire was less fortunate: its citizens advice service, which had four offices and an outreach service on Arran, closed in 2018 after the council withdrew its funding. Debt advice returned in 2022, run from Renfrewshire.

=== Edinburgh and the Lothians ===
Citizens Advice Edinburgh, formed in 2007 when the city's separate bureaux merged, traces its service back to 1939. Much of its work happens outside its bureaux. Scotland has placed welfare advisers in GP practices serving some of its most deprived communities, on the principle that sorting out money and housing problems helps people's health, and Citizens Advice Edinburgh's advisers hold sessions in eight practices, including in Craigmillar and Niddrie, as well as in hospitals and the city's jobcentres.

In Midlothian, Penicuik's bureau, founded in 1976, named its building Palmer House after Sir Geoff Palmer, Scotland's first black professor, who was a trustee from 2004 and later its chair.

=== Aberdeen and the North East ===
When the oil price fell in 2014–16, Aberdeen's Union Street bureau, long used to clients struggling with the city's high living costs, began seeing more people asking about redundancy and mortgage arrears, among them former high earners from the energy industry. In June 2016 it opened on a Saturday for the first time, to hold an advice day for oil and gas workers.

=== South of Scotland ===
In Dumfries and Galloway, as in several other areas, the bureau runs an in-court advice service at the sheriff court for people facing eviction or repossession, one of a number of such projects funded since 2009 by the Scottish Legal Aid Board. Advisers negotiate with landlords and lenders and can speak for clients on the day, and court staff and sheriffs steer people without a solicitor their way. In 2019–20 the service helped almost 500 people, and where it represented someone, homelessness was prevented in 98% of cases. Not every bureau can offer this, because the law limits who can represent people in the sheriff court.

The Scottish Borders is a lower-wage economy: in 2022 full-time pay in the region was £69 a week below the Scottish average. Its bureaux in Galashiels, Hawick and Peebles work as a consortium, and with Dumfries and Galloway's bureau they run an employment rights service for the south of Scotland that also advises employers on fair working practices. Outreach takes advice to small communities such as those in the Ettrick and Yarrow valleys, where travel costs had kept people from reaching an office.

=== Highlands and Islands ===
The Western Isles Citizens Advice Service has offices in Stornoway, Tarbert, Balivanich and Castlebay. It delivers the islands council's advice services under contract, including statutory ones, and the contract requires it to be bilingual in English and Scottish Gaelic.

Shetland had no bureau of its own until 1992. From 1986, people in Orkney and Shetland could call a freephone advice line to a bureau on the Scottish mainland. The Shetland Islands Citizens Advice Bureau opened in Lerwick in May 1992, and went on to run a crofting advice service, funded jointly with the Scottish Crofters Union, which answered questions on crofting law and land valuation. A 1998 study for the bureau found that in small island communities many people were reluctant to be seen going to an advice agency, and most made first contact by phone.

Energy costs shape much of the island work. The Western Isles has the highest rate of fuel poverty in Scotland, around 40% of households against a national average of 24%, in a wet, windy climate where the heating season lasts almost all year. In Shetland, where Scottish Government estimates have put around 31% of households in fuel poverty, the bureau set up a heating bill helpline in 2011, and in 2018 began offering free home visits from energy advisers, funded by the Scottish Government's Climate Challenge Fund. In Orkney, where fuel poverty has long been high, the Kirkwall bureau works with the local charity THAW Orkney on income maximisation, and THAW makes home visits across the isles.

In Argyll and Bute, a council area with 23 inhabited islands, one bureau based in Lochgilphead serves the whole area through outreach points, phone, email and video. Its volunteer advisers live everywhere from Helensburgh to Mull and can train online from home. In 2025 the bureau said it already helped many people on Islay by phone or email, but needed more volunteers on the island.

Eight bureaux cover the Highland Council area, funded since 2023 through a single council contract held by Inverness, Badenoch and Strathspey Citizens Advice Bureau. Across the region, advisers take the service to scattered communities. From Golspie, East and Central Sutherland's bureau holds sessions in villages from Dornoch to Helmsdale and Lairg and in two local hospitals; Lochaber's runs drop-ins in Kinlochleven and Mallaig; and Skye and Lochalsh's outreach advisers travel across Skye, Raasay and Lochalsh, including on home visits.

== Bureaux and advice services ==
=== The bureaux ===
Each citizens advice bureau in Scotland is an independent charity with its own board and is a member of CAS. Bureaux give advice from almost 300 locations, from city centres to remote and island communities. Members must follow the twelve principles of the Scottish Citizens Advice Bureau Service, and CAS audits both the quality of their advice and how they are run.

=== Advice ===
Bureaux advise on social security benefits, debt, energy, housing, employment, consumer problems and family matters. CAS describes the network as Scotland's largest provider of free debt advice. Social security is the largest area of advice, with energy the next largest in recent years. Advisers can negotiate with creditors, landlords and others on a client's behalf, and some bureaux represent clients at tribunals.

People can get advice in person at a bureau, by phone through the free Scottish Citizens Advice Helpline, which connects callers to their local bureau, and online. The public advice website for Scotland is produced jointly with Citizens Advice, the charity for England and Wales.

Bureaux also deliver national services funded by government: the Patient Advice and Support Service (since 2012); Help to Claim, a Department for Work and Pensions (DWP)-funded service that helps people apply for Universal Credit, run with Citizens Advice in England and Wales (since 2019); and the Money Talk Team, a Scottish Government funded project which helps people claim everything they are entitled to.

=== Advice content ===
Bureau advisers work from AdviserNet, a web-based information system written jointly by CAS and Citizens Advice. CAS adapts it for Scots law and Scottish policy, and writes the Scottish content of the public advice website.

Until 2005 the information system used by bureaux across Britain was on paper, filling more than 70 ring binders. In Scottish bureaux in the 1990s, its contents sheets were colour-coded: blue for items that applied in Scotland, yellow for those that did not. Bureaux received a monthly pack of replacement pages, with instructions for amending the text by hand. In 2005 the binders gave way to AdviserNet, available online, and on CD-ROM for outreach work beyond the reach of an internet connection.

=== Volunteers and professionalisation ===
The service began as an entirely volunteer effort and has grown steadily more professional.

Glasgow's first bureau was run by volunteers for three decades before hiring a paid organiser in the early 1970s. The Society of Social Service, which ran it, then described its refurbished Bath Street premises as the busiest and most modern bureau in Europe. Its manager inherited two part-time paid staff in 1978, and by 2024 the bureau had 26 staff and more than 40 volunteers.

Across Scotland, volunteers made up 71% of the 3,400 people working in bureaux in 2015–16, but about 58% in 2022–23.

People working in bureaux (Note: Figures cover people working in bureaux across Scotland and exclude CAS's own staff.)
Year	Bureau volunteers	Bureau paid staff
1942	700+	Not recorded
2015–16	c. 2,400	c. 1,000
2022–23	1,551	1,102

Much of the growth in paid staff has come in specialist roles. In 2022–23, 92% of bureaux employed paid money advisers, 92% paid benefits advisers and 78% paid tribunal representatives. Every new adviser completes a competence-based training programme lasting around six months.

=== Scale ===
CAS publishes network-wide figures each year. Counting methods can change over time, so figures from different years are not always directly comparable.

Year	Clients	Advice issues	Client financial gains	Ref.
2017–18	c. 262,000	c. 766,000	c. £138m	
2018–19	270,000+	c. 750,000	£131m+	
2019–20	188,000+	c. 660,000	£170m+	
2020–21	171,000+	c. 647,000	£146.9m	
2021–22	174,500+	c. 640,500	£132m+	
2022–23	187,000+	c. 670,000	£142m+	
2023–24	c. 192,000	680,000+	£158m+	
2024–25	196,540	702,568	£169.4m	

== Campaigning ==
Bureaux record anonymised statistics and case evidence about the people they see, which CAS uses to lobby politicians, civil servants and companies for changes to rules and practice. CAS describes the result as the most comprehensive data set on advice needs in Scotland.

Using clients' experiences to argue for change has been part of the citizens advice service across the UK since its early years. William Beveridge described the service as a window through which social workers and legislators could see "the man in the street". During the war, bureaux helped persuade the government to give pregnant women extra clothing coupons, and in 1948 a regional group of bureaux won extra cheese rations for gardeners after months of lobbying. Figures from Scottish bureaux on poll tax enquiries were cited in a House of Lords debate in 1990. The creation of the Scottish Parliament in 1999 gave CAS a more direct route for influence, such as on laws around debt enforcement, which were now devolved.

Before devolution, CAS had failed to get a debt arrangement scheme through Westminster. After 1999 it pressed the case at Holyrood, including through an all-party working group on alternatives to poindings and warrant sales. The resulting Debt Arrangement Scheme lets people repay their debts in full through one affordable monthly payment, shared between their creditors, under a plan approved by the Accountant in Bankruptcy. While a plan runs, creditors cannot take enforcement action, and interest and charges are frozen, then written off at the end. By 2019 almost 26,000 plans had been approved.

From 2012, CAS and Citizens Advice in England and Wales campaigned against the practices of payday lenders, using surveys of borrowers and case evidence from bureaux. The Financial Conduct Authority introduced stricter rules in 2014, and a cap on the cost of payday loans took effect in January 2015. Problems with payday loans reported to Citizens Advice then almost halved, and researchers at Newcastle University describe the 2012–14 campaign as successful.

CAS has used bureau evidence to document the extra costs of rural life. Its 2015 report Remotely Excluded found rural consumers were often refused delivery or charged more for online orders. A 2016 survey led by 16 bureaux found a median return bus fare of £9 from remote rural areas to the nearest jobcentre. Both findings are cited in the Scottish Government's evidence review on rural poverty.

In 2021 CAS proposed that people with serious mental health problems should get a pause on debt recovery, an idea also recommended by a Holyrood committee. The Bankruptcy and Diligence (Scotland) Act 2024 requires ministers to create such a mental health moratorium, and CAS sat on the Accountant in Bankruptcy's working group that advised on its design.

Council tax arrears are the most common debt that bureau clients bring. In 2023–24 the Scottish Government funded a CAS pilot in three council areas, in which bureaux gave targeted advice on council tax debt and worked with councils on their collection practice. In 2024 it extended the project to six more areas.

Individual bureaux campaign too. In Glasgow's East End, Bridgeton Citizens Advice Bureau worked with residents of Dalmarnock Village, built as the athletes' village for the 2014 Commonwealth Games, to document housing conditions there. Its 2026 report, A Much Deeper Rot, surveyed 89 households: 96.6% reported at least one housing problem, from flooding and sewage to collapsed ceilings, damp and mould, and the report called for an independent repair programme and compensation for residents. The three housing associations that manage the village's social rented homes apologised for past problems linked to the original construction, but said the findings were largely historic and drawn from a small sample.

== The national charity ==
CAS is a membership body: the bureaux are its members, and it gives no general advice to the public itself. It supplies bureaux with training, IT, the AdviserNet information system and quality audits. It also runs national services and represents the network to governments and regulators.

=== Governance ===
CAS became a charity in 1984 and took its current name in 1988. It is a charitable company limited by guarantee, registered in Scotland. It is run by a volunteer board with an independent chair and twelve trustees. Six trustees come from member bureaux and six are external to the network, and all are elected by the bureaux at the annual general meeting. This structure dates from 2017. In 2016 the chair resigned ahead of an independent review by Deloitte, which described the board's dynamics as dysfunctional and recommended 32 changes. Despite a court challenge by four Glasgow bureaux, members voted in 2017 for an independent chair and external trustees recruited on their skills.

=== Funding and independence from government ===
Bureaux and CAS are funded separately. Bureaux have historically relied mainly on their local authority, and each makes its own funding arrangements. CAS's core funding comes from government, and much of the network's work is publicly commissioned: the Scottish Government funds the patient advice service required by the Patient Rights (Scotland) Act 2011, the Extra Help Unit uses legal powers over energy suppliers, and Help to Claim is a Department for Work and Pensions (DWP) contract. Independence is nonetheless one of the network's founding principles. Speaking in the House of Lords in 1949, Beveridge said a bureau should be "one citizen giving advice to his fellows", someone who had taken the trouble to learn the problem, and not the state, which would avoid disclosing the weaknesses of its own administration. Today CAS describes bureaux as a complement to government agencies rather than part of them.

This dual role has periodically raised questions about independence. In 1990 a Conservative MP asked ministers to ensure that bureau advice was "non-political"; the minister called the concern legitimate given the public money involved, while a Labour MP replied that bureaux represented their clients whatever the government. In 2016, Third Force News reported insiders' belief that CAS's core funder, the UK Department for Business, Innovation and Skills, had pushed for the governance review that led to its reforms. When the Citizens Advice service took Department for Work and Pensions (DWP) funding for Help to Claim, some welfare rights campaigners questioned whether strings were attached. CAS said its funding agreement guaranteed its freedom to keep criticising Universal Credit and government policy. A JUSTICE working party later recommended that the DWP broaden Help to Claim beyond Citizens Advice, partly because some communities were reluctant to use it.

=== Consumer work and the Extra Help Unit ===
In 2012 Citizens Advice and CAS took over the UK consumer helpline, formerly Consumer Direct, with the Scottish service run from Glasgow and Stornoway. When Consumer Futures was abolished in 2014, its functions passed to Citizens Advice and CAS, and CAS became the body named in law to represent Scotland's energy, post and water consumers. After the Scotland Act 2016 devolved consumer advocacy, the Scottish helpline passed to Advice Direct Scotland in 2019, and most of CAS's statutory advocacy passed to the new Consumer Scotland in 2022.

The Extra Help Unit is a team of caseworkers in Glasgow that takes on complaints from energy and postal customers in vulnerable circumstances anywhere in Great Britain, such as people at risk of disconnection. It was set up in 2008 under the UK consumer body Consumer Focus and has legal powers under the Consumers, Estate Agents and Redress Act 2007. It moved to CAS in 2014, and CAS runs it on behalf of the Citizens Advice service as a whole. It also supports heat network customers in Scotland.

=== Single-sex toilet policy (2025) ===
In May 2025, after the Supreme Court's judgment in For Women Scotland Ltd v The Scottish Ministers, CAS's chief executive told staff that access to single-sex workplace toilets would be based on biological sex. The Ferret reported objections from staff, and legal experts who said the policy might discriminate against transgender staff. CAS said it was bound by the judgment and would review its approach if guidance changed.

== See also ==
- Citizens Advice
- Citizens Advice outside the United Kingdom
- Scottish Parliament
- Scottish devolution
- Social Security Scotland
