= Vehicle matching scam =

Scam about car sales

A vehicle matching scam works by people approaching owners who have put their cars up for sale in car sales publications and promising falsely to match the sellers with buyers in return for a one-off fee. On most occasions however, no buyers are found and the agent takes the fee.

In the United Kingdom, vehicle matching scams are listed by the AA as one of the most common used car buying scams. According to Peter Stratton of the Trading Standards Institute, high pressure selling alongside cold calling made this a very successful scam that often leaves consumers with little chance of obtaining redress.

According to the Office of Fair Trading (OFT) consumers in the UK lose nearly £3m a year from Vehicle Matching scams.

A number of the more notorious car matching scandals have been covered by the UK press. Vehicle Seller and Vehicle Match, two companies associated with Kieran Cassidy and described as "one of the worst offenders of the practice" were covered by the Daily Mirror between 2008 and 2009 . In October 2010 Kieran Cassidy was given an 11-year directorship disqualification for his role in Vehicle Seller and Vehicle Match. Express Match and Vehicle Searcher, two companies associated with Emmanuel Nwokedi, were exposed by The Guardian in 2008.

In 2008, the High Court heard a Hertfordshire company had misrepresented its services by claiming they already had enquiries from potential buyers.

Consumer Direct and the AA offer advice for people who think that they may have been a victim of car matching.
