= Utilities Intermediaries Association =

British energy sector trade body

The Utilities Intermediaries Association (UIA) is a trade body for Third Party Intermediaries (TPIs) in the United Kingdom business energy sector. TPIs, also known as energy brokers or consultants, facilitate the purchasing of electricity and gas by businesses, providing a range of services such as procurement, switching suppliers, query resolution, bill checking, and energy management in exchange for fees. The UIA works with the various organisations involved in the UK energy industry, with the aim of improving consumer confidence when purchasing energy.

== Structure ==
The UIA is a not-for-profit company limited by guarantee, incorporated in 2006.

Membership fees are on a sliding scale to give the very small broker through to the very large the opportunity of membership. As of 2021 there are around 30 approved members (also described as accredited members).

== The Boatmark and Code of Practice ==
All members of the UIA agree to adhere to a code of practice regarding how they operate. Fully accredited members can display the UIA 'boatmark' on their website or other communications, to give confidence to their clients and customers that they will follow the Code of Practice.

Whilst the assessment process is rigorous, the UIA mark is not necessarily a guarantee that a member's charges will remain transparent unless dealing with microbusiness whereby charges must be declared. To do this would require a rigorous and ongoing assessment process in which members' websites are continually monitored and customers contacted on a random basis to ensure their energy broker is complying with the UIA Code of Practice. In the absence of any complaint by the public, the degree to which members' websites are actively monitored for compliance to the UIA Code of Practice is random. Before engaging an energy broker, it is important to request that the energy broker confirm they are independent, unbiased, and exactly what their charges are.

== Campaigns ==
The UIA along with the Association of Convenience Stores (ACS) and the Forum of Private Business condemned the 2009 decision by industry regulator Ofgem not to outlaw rollover energy contracts, which would tie business users into another contract if they did not terminate their current contract within a specified period. In January 2010, Ofgem introduced new rules to protect smaller businesses, known as micro-businesses. The rule, known as Condition 7A, protects these businesses in three ways:

- A statement of renewal terms must be issued approximately 60 calendar days before the end of any contract.
- A notification window of 30 days must be given to contact the supplier when companies wish to switch supplier or negotiate a new contract.
- Contracts can only be rolled over for a maximum period of 12 months.
