= Consumer Futures =

New National Consumer Council
Non-departmental public body overview
- Formed: 1 October 2008
- Dissolved: 1 April 2014
- Type: Chief Executive
- Minister responsible: Vince Cable, Secretary of State for Business, Innovation and Skills
- Non-departmental public body executives: Christine Farnish, Chair; Mike O'Connor
- Parent Non-departmental public body: Department for Business, Innovation and Skills
- Website: www.consumerfutures.org.uk

The New National Consumer Council, operating as Consumer Futures, was a non-departmental public body and statutory consumer organisation in England, Wales, Scotland, and, for postal services, Northern Ireland. It was established by the Consumers, Estate Agents and Redress Act 2007, and began operations in 2008 by the merging of Postwatch, Energywatch and the Welsh, Scottish and National Consumer Councils under the Consumer Focus brand.

Following the UK Government's 2010 Spending Review, funding from the Department for Business, Innovation and Skills (BIS) for Consumer Focus was redirected to the Citizens Advice Bureau service, and in May 2013 Consumer Focus was renamed Consumer Futures. It was abolished as a non-departmental public body on 1 April 2014, when it was merged into Citizens Advice.

== History ==
The National Consumer Council was established by the Consumers, Estate Agents and Redress Act 2007, which merged Postwatch, Energywatch and the Welsh, Scottish and National Consumer Councils as a single organisation under the Consumer Focus brand. The Act gave Consumer Focus the right to investigate any consumer complaint if it is of wider interest, the right to open up information from providers, the power to conduct research and the ability to make an official super-complaint about failing services.

The Government announced in October 2010 that as part of its spending review, Consumer Focus would be abolished, and the Consumer Direct helpline would be taken over by the Citizens Advice Bureau network. The Government announced that some Consumer Focus' functions would transfer to Citizens Advice, Citizens Advice Scotland and the General Consumer Council for Northern Ireland following the Public Bodies Act 2011 and any necessary secondary legislation.

== Areas of work ==
The National Consumer Council undertook a study published in 2008 which found issues with the way 17 major IT businesses had been using End-user licence agreements (EULAs) for computer software, and asked the Office of Fair Trading to undertake an investigation.

One of the first causes taken up by Consumer Focus after its establishment was fuel poverty. In 2010, Consumer Focus examined payday loans in the United Kingdom, as the number of people taking out payday loans in the UK in recent years has increased four-fold, to 1.2 million in 2009.

== Predecessor organisations ==
=== Energywatch ===
Energywatch was charged with protecting and promoting the interests of all gas and electricity consumers in England, Scotland and Wales. Energywatch was created in November 2000 under the provisions of the Utilities Act 2000. The last Chief Executive was Allan Asher.

The organisation offered consumer information and advice, and pursued certain complaints which the energy suppliers have failed to resolve. In March 2005, Energywatch made a super-complaint to OFGEM about suppliers' billing practices. In response, OFGEM reduced the period within which suppliers could back-bill customers, and required suppliers to introduce a Billing Code of Practice on billing and an ombudsman scheme to resolve difficult complaints. Other issues tackled by Energywatch included energy mis-selling, customer transfers, debt issues, and disconnection.

In 2008, Energywatch was disbanded and replaced with Consumer Direct. Whilst Consumer Direct retained the primary function of Energywatch, to give advice over the telephone on energy related issues, it ceased to take on individual cases to resolve them.

=== Postwatch ===
Postwatch (officially: the Consumer Council for Postal Services) was a non-departmental public body set up in January 2001 – by Section 2 of the Postal Services Act 2000 to help customers with any issues or complaints they had with any Postal Service (including the Royal Mail) in the United Kingdom. It was funded by, and was accountable to, the Department of Trade and Industry and from 2007 the Department for Business, Enterprise and Regulatory Reform.

Postwatch worked to ensure customers receive the best possible postal service. As well as dealing with consumer queries and complaints, Postwatch investigated matters that were relevant to users of UK postal services or relating to the number and location of post offices. Postwatch was directed by an appointed part-time Council (with an appointed Chair), and a Chief Executive (not a Council Member). The final Chief Executive was Howard Webber.

== See also ==
- Consumer Direct
- Energy policy of the United Kingdom
- Energy use and conservation in the United Kingdom
- Energy switching services in the UK
- Office of Gas and Electricity Markets (industry regulator)
- Which?
