= Bankers' bonuses =

Performance-linked compensation paid to financial employees

Bankers' bonuses are traditionally paid or awarded to some workers in the finance industry at the end of the bank's financial year. They are intended to reward employee behavior during that year that has increased the profits of the bank or some relevant part of its business, as shown by the annual accounts. The bonus culture is usually associated with the front office or investment banking divisions (corporate finance, sales and trading, research) of banks. Although calculated in respect of past service, payment of all or part of a bonus may be deferred and made contingent on subsequent events, such as future profitability or continuing employment; this is especially appropriate if the business done is of a kind which cannot be reliably valued at the end of a year.

== Range and terms issued ==
Individual bonuses can range from a few thousand to tens of millions of dollars, pounds or euros, payable in cash or less obvious forms including pension funds, shares, options, profit-shares and assets derived from the bank's transactions. A variable performance-related bonus is often the substantial part of a senior banker's contractual remuneration; thus they effectively work for a share in the net profits (but not net losses) for which they are responsible, with a relatively small fixed salary. Such bonuses are payable under contract, rather than at discretion; nevertheless the amount of a contractual bonus usually depends on some subjective assessment of the factors required to be taken into account. Individual bonus awards may be calculated by reference to complex formulae combining personal, departmental, corporate, group or share price performances against targets; additional adjustments may be made for factors such as "guaranteed bonuses" often agreed for the early stages of a new employment or venture, loyalty bonuses, or "smoothing" in years where an individual outperforms the bank as a whole. In case of disagreement, especially on resignation, the proper basis of contractual bonus assessment, even if to some extent discretionary, can be negotiated or litigated.

The basis of any individual's bonus may vary from complete discretion of the bank's board or managers to a firm contractual entitlement; specific awards will depend on their employment contract, bonus scheme, and negotiations, as well as the bank's performance and the individual's. As well as individual contractual bonus arrangements, banks often have one or more discretionary bonus schemes to provide motivational structures to more junior staff without giving any entitlements. Of course, bonus policy is only one part of a bank's total remuneration and motivation structure which may include pay scales, promotions and reviews, share and option schemes, pensions, expenses, and benefits in kind.

== Common practices ==
One common practice is for the bank annually to make bonus awards to main board directors recommended by a board Remuneration Committee and also to declare a total bonus pool, which is then successively divided up and allocated between different departments and staff at each lower level at the discretion of an appropriate committee, director or manager, who will take account of individual rights and special cases. At low levels, where bonuses are a small proportion of total pay, bonuses may be awarded by groups or grades. For example, all qualifying staff at a basic grade might receive the same extra amount as an addition to their normal pay in March; or junior grades in a successful branch or department might receive an extra fixed percentage of their basic pay – this may be more motivational if unexpected, and is cheaper in succeeding years than an equivalent salary increase. At the most senior levels, directors and managers who are responsible for material parts of the bank's business may be entitled to an assessed share of the relevant profits, especially if their skills and contacts are readily transferable to competitors.

== EU banker bonus cap ==
There has been controversy in the media and elsewhere about the bonuses paid to bank staff, especially since the bank bailouts and rescue packages paid by governments during 2008 following the 2008 financial crisis.

This controversy has led to legislators seeking to restrict the way in which bonuses can be paid. Proposals from the European Union in April 2013 were to cap bonuses at 100% of salary unless at least 65% of the firm's shareholders approve an increase to 200% salary, or 75% of shareholders if there is no quorum. In April 2013, a €50m claim by former Dresdner Kleinwort staff was upheld by the UK Court of Appeal.

On 26 June 2013, the European Parliament and Council of the European Union passed the "EU banker bonus cap", which took effect on 1 January 2014. In December 2013, the European Banking Authority issued a final draft regulation to determine who a "material risk taker" is, which was expected to take effect in the first half of 2014. In September 2013, the United Kingdom sued over the cap.

On February 25, 2014, the EU's two legislative bodies, the European Parliament and the European Council, agreed to restrict retail asset managers' bonuses. The agreed upon Directive would restrict the form of bonuses requiring at least 50% of bonus amounts to be paid in shares of the fund under management, and at least 40% of bonus amounts must be deferred for three years.

On 20 November 2014, the Advocate General of the European Court of Justice (ECJ), Niilo Jääskinen, published his legal opinion that the EU cap was legitimate. Although the Advocate General's advice is not binding, the ECJ almost invariably follows it. The UK government subsequently announced that it was withdrawing its legal challenge to the cap. The Chancellor of the Exchequer, George Osborne, said in a statement: "I'm not going to spend taxpayers' money on a legal challenge now unlikely to succeed. The fact remains these are badly designed rules that are pushing up bankers' pay not reducing it. These rules may be legal but they are entirely self-defeating, so we need to find another way to end rewards for failure in our banks".

In March 2015, guidelines were proposed by the European Banking Authority (EBA) that increased the range of applications for the EU bonus cap. For banks the guidance removed the ability to use certain allowances that regulators believed were being used to circumvent the cap. The guidelines are due to come into force on January 1 2016. The guidance advised that they should be applied to compensation for the 2016 performance year.

== Tax announcement ==
In December 2009, the UK government announced in its pre-budget report its intention, during the first five months of 2010, to tax bonuses paid in this way by 50%. "Staff in banks who appropriate revenue in ludicrous bonuses which should otherwise go to strengthen the banks' capacity to resist write-offs, panics and bank-runs are in effect stealing from their customers, shareholders and the government," commented Will Hutton, executive vice-chair of The Work Foundation (formerly the Industrial Society), in The Guardian. The financial community "talk of the City being a national asset and a success story; of having to pay football star salaries of necessity; and that any insistence that the banks accept that they have obligations as well as rights to bailouts will be met by an exodus of talented staff to other countries," he said.

== See also ==
- AIG bonus payments controversy
- Banking and Financial Services Bill
- Bankruptcy of Lehman Brothers
- Emergency Economic Stabilization Act of 2008
- Federal Reserve Transparency Act
- Nationalisation of Northern Rock
- Swiss referendum "against rip-off salaries"
- Troubled Asset Relief Program
