= PFRA =

PFRA may refer to:

- Prairie Farm Rehabilitation Administration
- Professional Football Referees Association, forerunner of the National Football League Referees Association
- Professional Football Researchers Association
- Public Fundraising Regulatory Association, see Consumer protection in the United Kingdom
- pFra, a phospholipase involved in transmission of Yersinia pestis
