= HiQ (tyres) =

British retail chain (tyres, car servicing

HiQ is a nationwide British retailer of automobile tyres, and MoT car-servicing centres.

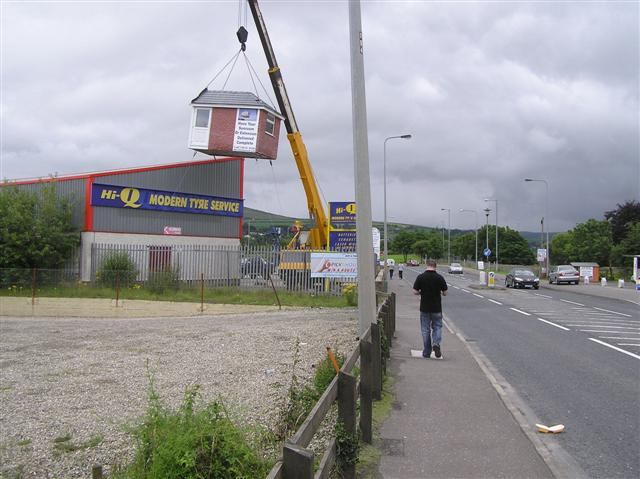
HiQ service centre in Strabane, County Tyrone in July 2009

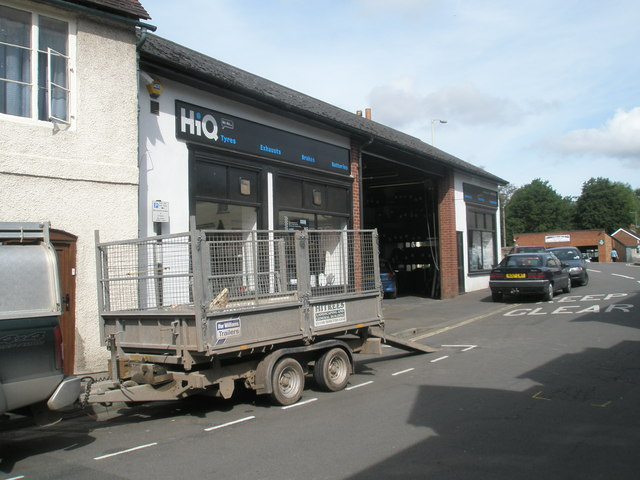
HiQ in Shropshire in August 2009

== History ==
The company was created in July 1992 as HiQ Tyreservices by Goodyear Tire and Rubber Company.

It was the main sponsor of the British Touring Car Championship (BTCC) in 2008, 2009 and 2014. It supplies the tyres exclusively for the British police.

The companies' outlets were improved in 2008.

== Structure ==
It has around 100 service centres across the UK. The company headquarters are at Trident Court on the 148-acre Birmingham Business Park, around a half-mile south-west of junction 4 of the M6, accessed from the A452. This is also the headquarters of Dunlop Tyres UK, which moved to the site in May 2017.

== Training ==
Technicians are trained at the HiQ Training Academy. The company would like all of its employees to have the Automotive Technician Accreditation (ATA) qualification.

== See also ==
- ATS Euromaster
- List of tire companies
