= Automotive Technician Accreditation =

The Automotive Technician Accreditation (ATA) is a trade qualification for all facets of automotive repair in the United Kingdom. It is a voluntary scheme (not legally binding) similar to that for electricians run by the NICEIC and similarly, is not government-run.

== History ==
It began in June 2005. It was introduced because the level of complexity required to maintain cars needed more competent technicians, from ATA-registered garages.

Around 25,000 mechanics are ATA-registered.

== Management ==
It is run by IMI Awards Ltd - IMIAL, a not-for-profit organisation that is part of the Institute of the Motor Industry (formerly Automotive Skills), based in Brickendon, Hertfordshire near Bayford railway station south of Hertford. They maintain a register of ATA qualified technicians. The IMI is the main national training organisation for automotive mechanics in the UK. The accreditations are a part of the (national) Qualifications and Credit Framework. IMIAL has around 21 full-time staff at its head office. IMIAL is a member of the Federation of Awarding Bodies IMIAL also maintains close contact with the Qualifications and Curriculum Development Agency.

=== Examination ===
Technicians are trained at over 500 approved centres (FE colleges and commercial training organisations) around Britain. Each set of practical tests for each type of accreditation takes around a day, with an online test (for simplicity of marking). It takes place at an IMI Awards Ltd centre.

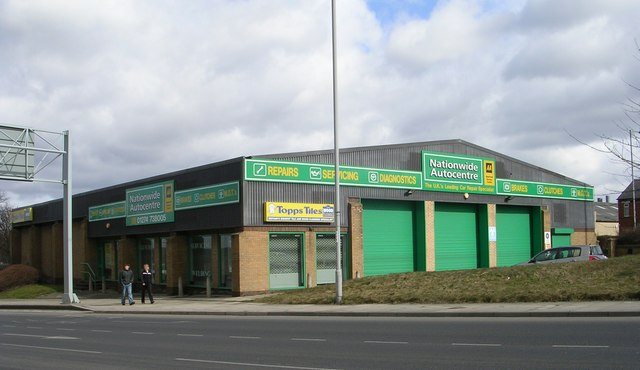
Nationwide Autocentre in Bradford

== See also ==
- Society of Motor Manufacturers and Traders
- Good Garage Scheme
