= The Hand and Heart =

Pub in Peterborough, England

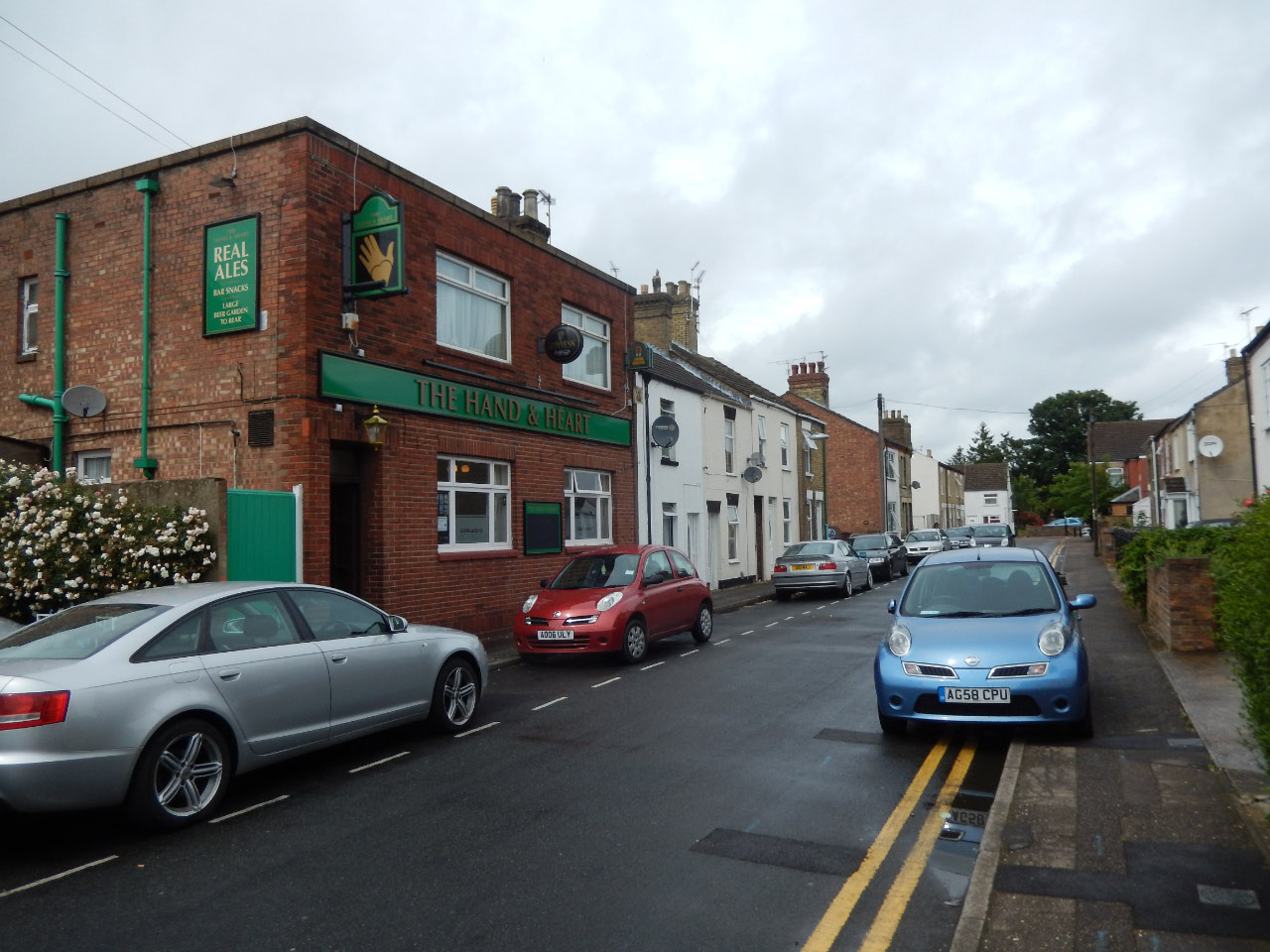
- The pub in 2018

General information
- Type: Public house
- Location: 12 Highbury Street, Peterborough, England
- Coordinates: 52.5857°N 0.2449°W
- Year built: 1938; 88 years ago
- Client: Warwicks & Richardsons Brewery
- Owner: Independent

The Hand and Heart is a public house on Highbury Street in Peterborough, England. The present building is a late Art Deco rebuild of an earlier pub, constructed in 1938 for Warwicks & Richardsons Brewery of Newark-on-Trent. It retains a remarkably complete interwar interior and is included on CAMRA's National Inventory of Historic Pub Interiors, where it is rated three stars and regarded as being of "outstanding national historic importance".

== History ==
The present building is a late Art Deco rebuild of an earlier public house. Plans for the proposed rebuilding, prepared by Warwicks & Richardsons Brewery of Newark-on-Trent, are dated February 1938 and show a two-bar layout with a side passage serving both rooms. Warwicks & Richardsons was later acquired by John Smith's Brewery of Tadcaster, which subsequently became part of Scottish & Newcastle. Ownership of the Hand and Heart passed to Enterprise Inns in 1989. As of February 2026, the freehold was independently owned. The building is a locally listed heritage asset.

It was included on the Campaign for Real Ale (CAMRA)'s National Inventory of Historic Pub Interiors before the inventory's grading system was revised. Under the revised scheme, it is rated three stars and its interior is regarded as being "of outstanding national historic importance".

== Architecture ==
=== Exterior ===
Occupying a terrace site, the two-storey building is constructed of plain brick and has a flat roof. Although the original brewery-branded front windows have been replaced, the exterior otherwise remains largely unchanged from its interwar appearance.

=== Interior ===
The interior survives largely as built and retains much of its original layout and fittings. An entrance lobby leads to a drinking lobby and former off-sales area, both of which retain black-and-white tiled floors, full-height glazed screens and original service features, including a bell push and a movable service window. The screen also bears the painted number "2", a survival from former licensing requirements.

The public bar preserves many elements of the original Art Deco scheme, including a distinctive bar counter, a mirrored bar back, service hatches and original fixed seating. Although the original fireplace has been replaced, the room also contains a Second World War memorial, a rare survival in a British pub.

A separate smoke room remains largely intact, retaining its original fixed seating, service hatch and lobby baffle. Historic signage survives on the door, including the painted words "Smoke Room" and the number "3". The original compartmentalised layout is further reflected in the survival of separate circulation routes and toilet facilities.
