= Ei Group =

British pub company

Ei Group Plc
- Industry: Pubs
- Founded: 1991; 35 years ago
- Defunct: 2020
- Fate: Acquired by Stonegate Pub Company
- Key people: Robert Walker (chairman); Simon Townsend (chief executive)
- Products: Public house leases and tenancies
- Revenue: £724 million (2019)
- Operating income: £247 million (2019)
- Net income: £(209) million (2019)
- Number of employees: 2,180 (2019)
- Website: eigroupplc.com

Ei Group plc, formerly known as Enterprise Inns plc, was the largest pub company in the UK, with around 4,000 properties, predominantly run as leased and tenanted pubs. Ei Group plc was headquartered in Solihull, West Midlands. It was listed on the London Stock Exchange until it was acquired by Stonegate Pub Company in March 2020.

== History ==
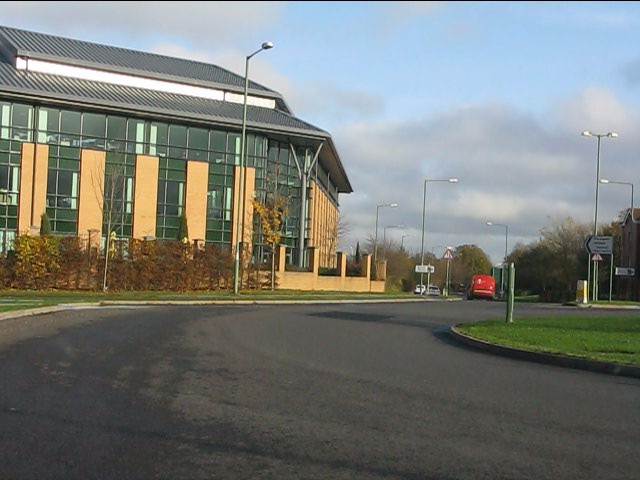
Ei Group's offices in Solihull

The company was founded by Ted Tuppen, initially with 300 pubs from Bass, as Enterprise Inns in 1991. The company listed on the London Stock Exchange in 1995. The group made a series of acquisitions including 1,864 former Laurel Pub Company pubs from Whitbread in 2002 and 4,054 pubs with the acquisition of the Unique Pub Company in 2004.

Enterprise Inns had over 9,000 pubs on completion of the acquisition of the Unique Pub Company and it formed part of the FTSE100 Index at that time. However, the decline in the UK pub trade led to its removal from the FTSE100 in 2008. Due to its high level of debt the company stopped paying dividends to shareholders in 2009.

Ted Tuppen stood down as chief executive in February 2014 and Enterprise Inns rebranded to Ei Group in February 2017.

In July 2019 Stonegate Pub Company announced its intention to acquire Ei Group for £1.27 billion. That same month and year, Stonegate pursued the acquisition of Ei Group in a £3 billion deal which will "add almost 4,000 new pubs to Stonegate Pub Company’s 765 existing locations".

== Operations ==
The pubs are operated by tenants, which means that the company collects rent from individuals who operate and often live in the pubs. They also operate (in most, but not all cases) what is known as a beer tie. This means that tenants renting public houses from them are under contract to buy beer, ciders, alcopops and other alcoholic drinks from Enterprise Inns only. Under some leases tenants are required to also purchase other products, such as soft drinks, wines and spirits from Enterprise, although this is not as widespread as the beer tie.

== Reflections on business practice ==
On 12 May 2009, The Guardian newspaper reported how "Enterprise Inns counts cost of bad pub landlords": the recession had forced the company to take action against more than 100 "poor quality and underperforming licensees" since last autumn. It is spending £1.4m a month on financial assistance to help those in distress, on top of the £700,000 a month cost of freezing the price of five lager and ale brands. Chief executive Ted Tuppen told The Guardian: "If people are genuinely struggling and will work with us, we are providing an awful lot of help". The cost of these programmes was however contributing to a slump in profits.

On 13 May 2009, the House of Commons published a report regarding a monopolies inquiry into pub groups. The report "raises a series of questions about the pub company (pubco) tied pub business model and calls on the Government to act urgently, in particular, to refer the matter to the Competition Commission. It challenges the pubcos which operate a tie to prove its benefits by giving lessees the choice between a tied or free of tie lease." The report also raises issues regarding the actual conduct of pubcos in dealing with struggling tenants.

Committee chairman Peter Luff, MP says: "The report explicitly acknowledges that 'not all the problems of the pub industry come from the tied pub model. It is clear there are many pressures on any retail business ... Nonetheless, our inquiry found alarming evidence indicating there may be serious problems caused by the dominance of the large pub companies.'"

According to an article in Private Eye, the select committee asked 1,000 publicans for their opinions regarding their experiences working with Britain's largest pubcos, which includes Enterprise Inns. The Eye states that the committee's findings had "at last shed light on an industry in freefall, with 40 pubs closing [in the UK] every week. Pubcos are essentially greedy property companies with a cuddly name – and they own nearly half the country's pub freeholds."

The Committee commissioned its own independent survey as part of the inquiry, to determine whether the negative evidence it initially received from lessees was typical of feelings in the industry.

"The survey results, printed with the Committee's evidence, underpinned the Committee's findings. 64 per cent of lessees did not think their pubco added any value and while a fifth had had a dispute with their pubco, few (18 per cent) were satisfied with the outcome. The Committee was astonished to learn that 67 per cent of the lessees surveyed earned less than £15,000 pa and over 50 per cent of the lessees who had turnover of more than £500,000 pa earned less than £15,000 – a 3 per cent rate of return. The lessees may share the risks with their pubco but they do not appear to share the benefits. The report therefore concludes that problems which were identified by the Trade and Industry Committee four years ago remain. An imbalance of bargaining power between lessees and pubcos persists and the arrangements for assessing rents remain opaque. Rental assessment should be the basis for negotiation, but incumbent lessees often risk the loss of their home as well as their business if they cannot reach agreement, the report says."

The Eye says the committee found that pubco tenants are initially attracted to run pubs by low entry costs, but soon find that making a decent living is very difficult. Tenants' leases oblige them to buy alcoholic drinks from nominated suppliers at up to twice the open-market price. If a struggling tenant leaves, another tenant can be found to replace them. In the years of booming property prices this practice was successful, but is much less so now, as evidenced by the number of pub closures. The Guardian reported that MPs found an imbalance of power that can amount to "downright bullying" between the big pubcos, such as Enterprise Inns and Punch Taverns, and their tenants. In 2008, one tenant who felt forced to close the pub he ran with his wife said:

"We told Enterprise [Inns] we were struggling and needed some help; they didn't come forward with any. If we were late paying bills we would get threatening phone calls. They could have put a hold on the rent or given us a discount until we managed to get business back up. If we didn't pay bills on time they wouldn't deliver the beer and when they did deliver it they would charge us for carriage. Instead of helping us they were making it worse."

The MPs are said to also want a ban on pubcos selling pub premises with restrictive covenants that prevent them being used as pubs in the future. Ted Tuppen explained the need for covenants to the committee by saying there are too many pubs in some areas and Enterprise used restrictive covenants "because, genuinely, we think these are pubs that have lived their life". However, he admitted that 70% of Enterprise sales have such covenants in place.

The select committee was not generally impressed by the pubcos' senior executives, rebuking them for having given "partial" and even "false" evidence to the committee.

The committee recommended that "the tying of beers, other drinks and ancillary products should be severely limited to ensure that competition in the retail market is restored." The Eye notes that select committee chairman Peter Luff "may be looking to right the wrong created by the Thatcher government's disastrous "Beer Orders" of 1989, in which he was involved."

Shortly following the committee's report, CAMRA issued a super-complaint forcing the Office of Fair Trading (OFT) to investigate this within 90 days. The OFT published its report on 22 October 2009. The report largely cleared the industry of behaving in any way that caused damage to consumers.
