= Simon Townsend (businessman) =

British businessman

- Born: William Simon Townsend; February 1962 (age 64)
- Occupations: CEO, Enterprise Inns

William Simon Townsend (born February 1962) is a British businessman, CEO of Enterprise Inns, a British pub company, and a constituent of the FTSE 250 Index.

William Simon Townsend was born in February 1962.

Townsend has been a director of Enterprise Inns since 1 October 2000, and CEO since 6 February 2014. He has also worked for Whitbread, Allied Domecq, Rank Group, Marstons, and Thompson & Eversheds.
