= Good Garage Scheme =

Good Garage Scheme is a series of same name automobile repair shop monitoring schemes in the United Kingdom (UK), claiming to improve industry repair standards for the benefit of consumers. The service is not run by an independent organisation, but by a company manufacturing lubricants and other automotive products, and any garage wanting to be member is required to recommend and sell the products from this company. The scheme provides some benefits to customers for example accountability and feedback, however the motivation and impartialness of the website has been called into question causing some controversy.

Initially, Trade Secretary Stephen Byers raised the idea for a government "good garage" scheme in December 2000. After Good Garage Scheme (government) was released in 2002, the motor industry sought to develop its own good garage scheme in May 2003 as a way of self-regulating its garage members. By 2006, the motor industry had not implemented its Good Garage Scheme (industry). At about that same time, Coventry, England based Forte Lubricants, a manufacturer of petrol and diesel-operated engine additives typically used in garages, maintained a website that supported Forte Lubricants' own association of vehicle workshops/garages, where each member garage agreed to comply with some of the good garage scheme material published by the Department of Trade and Industry. The resulting Good Garage Scheme (Forte), an online self-regulatory body operated by Forte Lubricants for independent workshops and Minister for Transport Centres throughout the United Kingdom, has grown from about 800 member garages in 2006 to about 3,000 member garages in 2010.

== History ==
=== Good Garage Scheme (government) and Good Garage Scheme (industry) ===
In December 2000, Trade Secretary Stephen Byers, a British Labour Party politician who was the Member of Parliament (MP) for North Tyneside from 1997 to 2010, raised the idea of "good garage" schemes for garages along the same lines as the AA star ratings for hotels or Michelin stars for restaurants. By September 2001, the UK government released details of a 'good garage' scheme proposal to address sub-standard servicing operations in the consumer market. Presented in a 2001 Department of Trade and Industry (DTI) task force report entitled Jacking Up Standards, the Good Garage Scheme (government) provided that the government would assist fleet managers to identify garages that offer a better quality service, and would more particularly address received complaints. Detractors to the proposals indicated that it duplicated work already done by the Retail Motor Industry Federation (RMI) and, per the Society of Motor Manufacturers and Traders, the proposal did not go far enough and needed a compulsory licensing programme for servicing operations. In response, the Department of Trade and Industry made efforts to include kitemarks for respected mechanics, but by the summer of 2002 admitted that including that UK product and service quality certification mark was difficult to organise with the kitemark trademark owner, The British Standards Institution. In August 2002, RMI announced that it had its own Good Garage scheme to allow the garage industry itself to establish a mark of quality to boost consumer confidence and provide a controlled framework for garages to operate within.

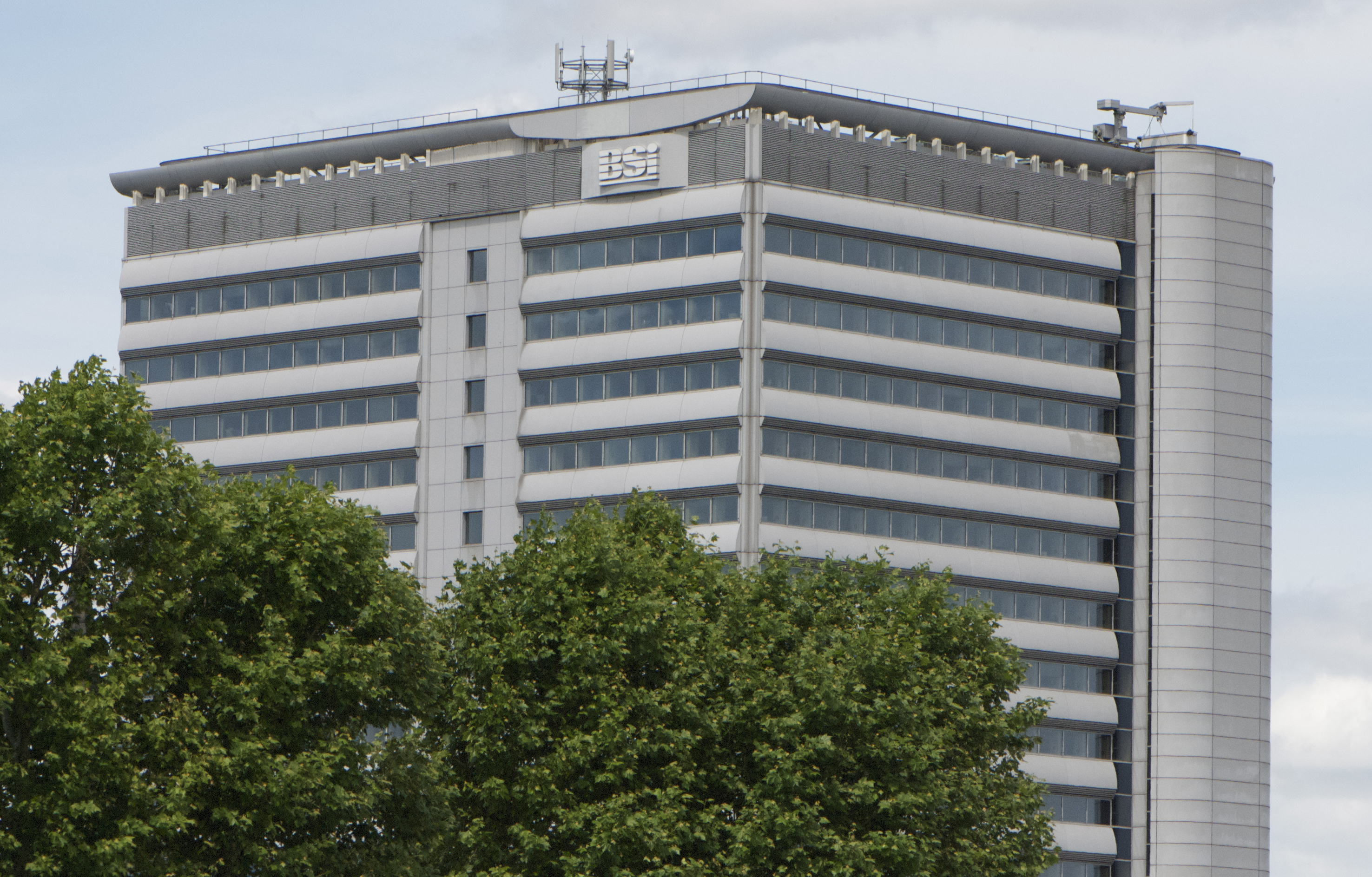
The British Standards Institute Group head office building in Chiswick, London

In September 2002, DTI Consumer Minister Melanie Johnson released Good Garage Scheme (government), a Government-backed voluntary code having minimum standards "backed by regular undercover checks to ensure garages meet the standards." The scheme, summarised in a "Be Garage Wise" guide, had no funding and Ministers expected the funding to come from the motor industry itself. Significantly, the government did not invite trade associations such as RMI, the Society of Motor Manufacturers and Traders, and the Scottish Motor Trade Association to the DTI Good Garage scheme announcement meeting; each association previously had refused to submit garages within their organisations to a system of independent inspection. About a week after DTI's Good Garage scheme announcement, trade associations announced that they would develop their own Good Garage scheme to be maintained by a self-regulatory body. In May 2003, motor industry representatives and representatives from the Office of Fair Trading signed an agreement to create an industry run Good Garage Scheme (industry) that would set standards for local garages.

By February 2006, the motor industry had not yet implemented its promised Good Garage Scheme (industry). In addition, the British Standards Institute, who had been trying to expand their kitemark quality of assurance to include British motor mechanics, had received fewer than 100 applications and only issued three license to Britain's 25,000 motor workshops. Although these efforts were not succeeding, an Internet website www.goodgaragescheme.co.uk, run by Forte Lubricants, was bringing in good garage scheme members as part of an internet-based association of vehicle workshops/garages.

=== Good Garage Scheme (Forte) ===
Forte Lubricants (Forte or Forté) is a manufacturer of petrol and diesel-operated engine additives, including products such as engine oil fortifiers, engine oil system protectors, cooling system flushes, brake cleaners, air conditioner treatment, cooling system conditioners, as well as other products typically use by garages. Forte Lubricants is a division of Illinois Tool Works Ltd and operates throughout the United Kingdom with a regional network of 100+ sales agents in 11 regions and works with around 9,000+ garages, workshops and franchised dealers. In 1997, Forte Lubricants had an about 40% share of the gasoline additives market in India.

On 23 September 2002, seven days after DTI Consumer Minister Melanie Johnson released the government Good Garage scheme, Forte Lubricants registered goodgaragescheme.com as a domain name. In 2003, just after motor industry representatives and representatives from the Office of Fair Trading (OFT) signed an agreement to create an industry run Good Garage Scheme, the Office of Fair Trading issued a car service checklist that recommended to garages what should be included in a service and enabled consumers to compare what different garages offer as part of a car service. Forte Lubricants then began using the Office of Fair Trading's car service checklist in its promotional material. The Office of Fair Trading felt that Forte Lubricants' usage of the checklist as well as usage of the OFT's name and logo in its marketing material lead to consumers to believe that the OFT recommended the use of a fuel system cleaner and an engine oil flush, neither of which were addressed by the Office of Fair Trading. In general, the OFT does not approve any products or recommend what products should be used by garages when providing a car service. In response to a request by the Office of Fair Trading, Forte Lubricants agreed in June 2003 to stop using the OFT's name and logo in Forte's marketing material as legal action was threatened against Forte.

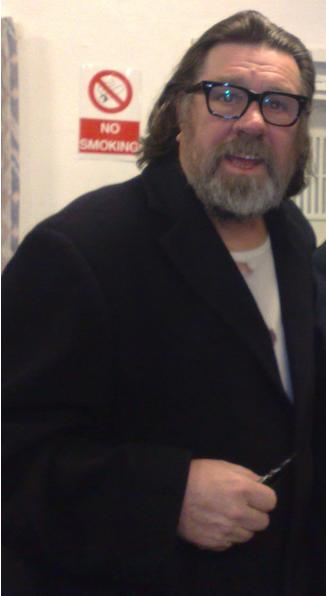
English actor and comedian Ricky Tomlinson's Liverpool-based Royle Motors garage joined Good Garage Scheme (Forte) in 2007.

In the summer of 2005, goodgaragescheme.com received 15,000 visitors, each of whom were able post their garage comments on the website in much the same way that buyers and sellers on eBay get a rating. By November 2006, Forte sponsored goodgaragescheme.com had been developed into Good Garage Scheme (Forte), an online organisation designed to help motorists find a trustworthy garage. In addition, Good Garage Scheme (Forte) had registered 810 garages and made plans to obtain 3,000 garage members by December 2007 under the guidance of Forte's sales director, Bob Welch. In December 2006, Simon Butler created the website whichgarage.co.uk in competition with goodgaragescheme.com for honest and reliable garage advertisements.

Under the Good Garage Scheme (Forte) publicised in November 2006, Forte Lubricant inspectors would observe each garage applicant to see if they had the proper equipment and that customers were made aware beforehand of likely costs and time and were consulted before any changes were made. Once becoming a member of Good Garage Scheme (Forte), a garage was required to comply with a 50-point checklist approved by the Office of Fair Trading as part of an industry standard servicing programme. In addition, there was to be "notices in reception areas informing customers of their rights – for instance, they must be shown the replaced part should they ask to see it, and there should be a guarantee leaflet should anything go wrong. Moreover, a complaints procedure should also be in place." As noted by Forte Lubricants marketing manager Rachel Greasby "Garages in the Good Garage Scheme have a good reputation and are properly vetted by us."

In February 2007, Good Garage Scheme (Forte) had 1,200 members. By May 2007, more than 1,500 garages were involved with Good Garage Scheme (Forte). In June 2007, when English actor and comedian Ricky Tomlinson's Liverpool-based Royle Motors garage joined Good Garage Scheme (Forte), the online Forte association had more than 1,700 members. "We've joined the Good Garage Scheme because we think it's important to raise the reputation of garages like ours and show we adhere to strict customer service guidelines," actor Tomlinson said at the time his garage became a member.

In March 2009, the Good Garage Scheme (Forte) launched a 21-point "Spring Check" for vehicle components such as engine oil, coolant system, brakes, tyres, windscreens, wipers, and lights. Phil Dugmore, Technical Manager at Forte, noted, "The Spring Check will enable our membership to give motorists expert advice on the condition of their vehicles and rectify any problems." By this time, membership at Good Garage Scheme (Forte) had risen to 2600 member garages and Good Garage Scheme (Forte) registered a new website, ggsbenefits.co.uk, to serve its member garages. During the summer of 2009, Good Garage Scheme (Forte) urged its members to ensure that their vehicle air conditioning system was properly maintained "to avoid a potential major health hazard." In addition, the website of Good Garage Scheme (Forte) was attracting more than 12,000 new visitors a month, each staying on the site for nearly five minutes. In response, Good Garage Scheme (Forte) launched an improved version of its goodgaragescheme.com website to better enable motorists to find one of its now 2,734 member garages and to handle the 20,000 customer feedback forms received every month. By January 2010, Good Garage Scheme (Forte) had 2,811 member garages. Reported to have been launched in 2006, Good Garage Scheme (Forte) had expanded its consumer protection structure to include a five-star rating system based on a strict Code of Conduct and a 50-point Industry Standard Service.

In August 2010, the United Kingdom product-testing and campaigning charity Which? performed an undercover investigation of garages and found that 64 per cent of automobile faults were rectified by the garages affiliated to the Bosch Car Service scheme, 60 per cent of the automobiles were rectified by garages under the Motor Codes, a scheme organised by the Society of Motor Manufacturers and Traders, 43 per cent of the problems were fixed by garages not affiliated with any scheme, and 39 per cent of the problems were fixed by garages under the Good Garage Scheme (Forte). In September 2010, Good Garage Scheme (Forte) launched its largest-to-date national television advertising campaign. A month later, Good Garage Scheme (Forte) posted a three-minute video on its member benefits website www.ggsbenefits.co.uk to reiterate how members can improve customer service. In a 25 November 2010 press release, Good Garage Scheme (Forte) noted that it "has more than 3,000 members" that are "independent garages and workshops."

== See also ==
- California Bureau of Automotive Repair
- Union of Workers in Industry, Garages, Construction Firms, Mines and Printers
