= Super-complaint =

Consumer compaint made in the UK by approved organisation

A super-complaint is a complaint made in the UK by a state-approved "super-complainant" or watchdog organisation on behalf of consumers, which was fast-tracked to a higher authority such as the Office of Fair Trading (prior to its dissolution on 1 April 2014). The official body now responsible for dealing with general consumer protection super-complaints is the Competition and Markets Authority (CMA).

A super-complaint, as defined in section 11(1) of the UK's Enterprise Act 2002, is a complaint submitted by a designated consumer body stating that "any feature, or combination of features, of a market in the UK for goods or services is or appears to be significantly harming the interests of consumers".

Super-complaints have also specifically been introduced for the financial markets in the UK under the aegis of the Financial Conduct Authority (FCA). The Financial Services and Markets Act 2000 (FSMA) provides that certain consumer bodies may complain to the FCA about features of a market for financial services in the UK that may be significantly damaging the interests of consumers. The Government first issued guidance for bodies seeking designation as super complainants and then received and ultimately approved the bodies which could make super-complaints to the FCA.

In 2018, super-complaints expanded to UK law enforcement agencies, allowing designated organizations to raise concerns that a feature, or combination of features, of policing in England and Wales is significantly harming the interests of the public. The police super-complaint system became operational on 1 November 2018 and allows government-designated organizations to file complaints that are jointly considered by His Majesty’s Inspectorate of Constabulary and Fire & Rescue Services, the College of Policing, and the Independent Office for Police Conduct.

The Online Safety Act 2023 also contains a procedure for super-complaints. Regulations made pursuant to the Act allow for determination of whether a body has eligibility to bring a super-complaint to be made after a complaint has been brought.

== Super-complainants ==
Some of the super-complainants under the Office of Fair Trading scheme were:

- Which?
- National Consumer Council
- Citizens Advice
- Energywatch
- Consumer Council for Water (formerly known as Watervoice)
- Postwatch
- Campaign for Real Ale
- General Consumer Council for Northern Ireland

What Car? magazine also applied, but was rejected.

The organisations which can make super-complaints to the FCA are the General Consumer Council for Northern Ireland, Citizens Advice, the Federation of Small Businesses, and Which?.

== Examples ==
- The first ever police super-complaint was filed by Liberty and the Southall Black Sisters and examined the sharing of crime victims’ and witnesses’ personal data with immigration authorities, recommending limited safeguards through an Immigration Enforcement Migrant Victims Protocol rather than a full firewall between policing and immigration enforcement.
- Which? raised a super-complaints in April 2015 about misleading supermarket pricing practices such as where it was difficult for customers to compare unit prices or where product sizes were reduced but the price was not changed.
- In March 2020, the Centre for Women’s Justice submitted a super-complaint alleging systemic failures in how police forces in England and Wales handled domestic abuse allegations involving police officers and staff.

== See also ==
- TheUndisciplined. "Is It a Bird? Is It a Plane? No, It's a Super Complaint!".
- OFT (13 January 2012). "Super Complaints".
