= Society of Motor Manufacturers and Traders =

UK automotive industry association

- Abbreviation: SMMT
- Formation: 1902
- Legal status: Not for profit company
- Purpose: Employer organisation for the UK motor trade
- Location: London
- Region served: United Kingdom
- Members: UK automotive companies and motoring organisations
- Chief Executive: Mike Hawes,
- Main organ: SMMT Executive (President – Mick Flanagan, Vice President, Adient)
- Affiliations: Association des Constructeurs Européens d'Automobiles (ACEA – European Automobile Manufacturers Association)
- Website: www.smmt.co.uk

The Society of Motor Manufacturers and Traders (SMMT) is the trade association for the United Kingdom motor industry. Its role is to "promote the interests of the UK automotive industry at home and abroad."

== History ==
SMMT was founded by Frederick Richard Simms on 16 July 1902. In January 1959 it moved to Forbes House, Belgravia, and in August 2011 it moved into its current offices at 71 Great Peter Street, London.

=== Motor Show ===
One of its early functions was holding motor shows, the earliest of which was at Crystal Palace in January 1903 (now known as the British International Motor Show). The Motor Industry Research Association (MIRA) was formed in 1946. In 1978, the Motor Show moved to the National Exhibition Centre. In 2006, the Motor Show returned to London at ExCel in 2006.

=== Vehicle registrations ===
In July 1972 it started the Motor Vehicle Registration Information System (MVRIS), which works on behalf of the government to collate data about new registrations of vehicles. Data is obtained from vehicle manufacturers and/or importers and the Driver & Vehicle Licensing Agency. Figures are released on the fourth working day of every month and detailed analysis is available for purchase.

=== Consumer protection ===
The Motor Industry Code of Practice for New Cars was launched in 2004, which provides trading standards for consumers, via automotive traders who are registered with the Motor Codes code of practice. The UK car industry has had a reputation of a minority of garages and repair companies giving consumers a less-than-satisfactory level of performance, with (generally) female consumers being cynically targeted for excessive costs for maintaining their cars. Call-out charges for repairs and roadside breakdowns have been known to be uncompetitively high. The Motor Industry Code of Practice for Service and Repair was launched in August 2008 to correct any cowboy practices of financial manipulation. More than 4,000 garages across the UK now are registered with this scheme. It was claimed by the National Consumer Council that substandard repair work by UK garages was costing consumers around £4 billion a year.

== Activities ==
The organisation "promotes the interests of the UK automotive industry at home and abroad" for a sector that produced 1.6 million vehicles – including cars and commercial vehicles – and 2.71 million engines in the UK (2018) and employs a UK workforce of more than 823,000. The organisation advocates and lobbies on behalf of the sector, in particular for vehicle and component manufacturers, and the motor retail sector.

=== Lobbying ===
Scientists on the Climate Change Committee advised a total ban of petrol and diesel engine sales including for hybrids by 2032 to meet the UK government's decarbonisation goals. The SMMT lobbied the government to delay this ban. The resulting delay was a "significant victory for the car industry" according to The Guardian.

== See also ==
- Automobile safety
- Euro NCAP
- Good Garage Scheme
- Transport Research Laboratory
- Royal Society for the Prevention of Accidents
