= UK default charges controversy =

The UK default charges controversy was an issue in consumer law, relating to the level of fees charged by banks and credit card companies for late or dishonoured payments, exceeding credit limits, etc.

The Supreme Court in 2009 largely resolved the matter of current (checking) account charges in favour of the banks.

== Legal background ==
A personal account holder at a bank may have a number of facilities associated with their accounts, such as the ability to process direct debit transactions, standing orders for regular fixed payments, and an overdraft. Banks may typically charge customers a fee of around £30 (individual banks vary) for authorising a transaction which puts a customer over their authorised overdraft limit, or for refusing payment when there are insufficient funds held in the account to meet it. Similarly, credit card issuers typically (until June 2006) charged customers a fee of around £25 for payment that is late, insufficient, or not made, and the same for exceeding their authorised credit limit.

When a customer exceeds their agreed overdraft limit, this constitutes a breach of contract. When this happens, the injured party (in this case the bank) is entitled to be reimbursed with a reasonable sum to cover the costs it has incurred as a result of the breach, or otherwise the value of the injury expressed in cash terms (liquidated damages). The value does not have to reflect the actual amount of the losses, only that it is a reasonable estimate of such. If the amount demanded by the injured party is excessive, they are unjustly enriched, and the breaching party has no obligation to pay the excess.

Any clause in a contract which makes a provision by which unjust enrichment may occur may be unenforceable at law - that is to say that if the amount is excessive, the injured party will be unable to enforce the charge in court. Any clause which explicitly provides for unjust enrichment is considered unlawful at common law.

=== Precedent case law ===
- Wilson v Love [1896] 1 QB 626 — A tenant farmer agreed to pay an additional rent of £3 per ton by way of penalty for every ton of hay or straw that he sold off the premises during the last 12 months of the tenancy. The clause was regarded as a penalty because at the time hay was worth five shillings per ton more than straw, and thus the landlord was unjustly enriched to the tune of 5s for each ton of straw sold.
- Dunlop Pneumatic Tyre Co Ltd v New Garage & Motor Co Ltd [1915] AC 79 — The House of Lords decided that a liquidated damages clause would be considered a penalty and therefore unenforceable where the sum to be paid by the defendant was 'extravagant and unconscionable in amount in comparison with the greatest loss that could conceivably be provided to have followed from the breach.'
- Bridge v Campbell Discount Co. Ltd. [1962] AC 600 — A customer bought a car under a hire purchase agreement, paid the initial and first payments and then cancelled the agreement. The company tried to recover large sums specified in the contract for cancelling the agreement, but the court decided these were excessive and constituted a penalty, making them unenforceable.
- Murray v Leisureplay (2004) — A former employee of Leisureplay was sacked and attempted to claim three years' salary, as outlined in his contract of employment. The court decided this was excessive and constituted a penalty, therefore he was not entitled to this level of damages.

== The OFT ruling ==
In 2006 the Office of Fair Trading investigated the charges being imposed on customers of credit card companies. In its report, the OFT said that many of their default charges were unlawful, as they constituted unjust enrichment. It stated that it would act upon receiving notice of any charge over £12 as a penalty, and therefore unlawful. However, the report also specifically stated that the OFT did not necessarily consider £12 a fair charge, and that this would be up to a court to determine. It suggested that the £12 "cap" was intended as an initial step towards fair practice and compliance with the law. Whether or not an individual charge constituted a penalty fee would be based on the established legal precedent that the only cost recoverable would be actual costs incurred.

The credit card companies have so far insisted that their charges are in line with policy and information provided to customers. A report in produced in October 2006 by the Competition Commission on banking in Northern Ireland stated that "charges are a significant source of revenue for the banks on [personal cheque accounts] . [Bank name omitted] said that increased unauthorized overdraft fees were part of the strategic imperative to turn the PCA into a profitable business over time."

The report explicitly states that while the investigation was into default charges levied towards credit card customers, there is no reason why the same principle should not extend to personal banking. Some customers have successfully demanded the return of penalty charges for returned cheques, direct debits and unauthorised overdraft charges.

Frequently the charges are applied without any notification to the account holder other than when it appears as a transaction in their bank statement.

== Recovery ==
In order to recover charges imposed by the banks and credit card companies, many customers have filed cases with the small claims court. In England and Wales, customers can claim back money that has been taken from their accounts up to six years ago, in line with the Limitation Act 1980. In Scotland, the limit is up to five years.

== See also ==
- Office of Fair Trading
- Liquidated damages
