= Birmingham Business Park =

Coordinates: 52.469°N 1.719°W

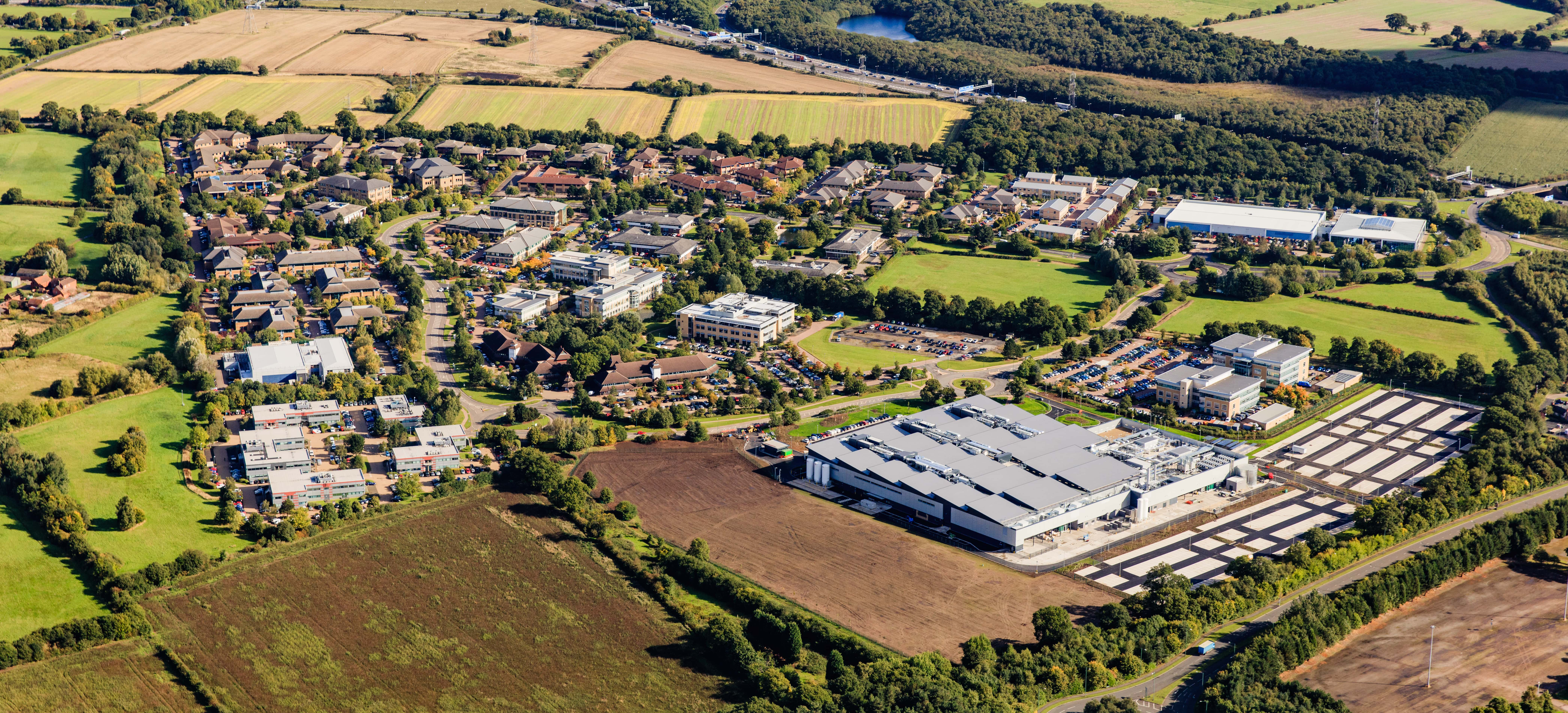
- Aerial view

- Location within the West Midlands
- Civil parish: Bickenhill and Marston Green
- Metropolitan borough: Solihull
- Metropolitan county: West Midlands
- Region: West Midlands
- Country: England
- Sovereign state: United Kingdom
- Post town: BIRMINGHAM
- Postcode district: B37, B40
- Dialling code: 0121
- Police: West Midlands
- Fire: West Midlands
- Ambulance: West Midlands
- UK Parliament: Meriden

Birmingham Business Park is 'the most established out-of-town office park in the Midlands' and is home to 116 companies, over 7000 employees and is the European and UK office headquarters for over 20 organisations. The Park offers 24 hour security and an on-site management team.

Centrally located off Junction 6 of the M42 and Junction 4 of M6 within the Metropolitan Borough of Solihull, it has immediate access to the Midlands motorway network with direct links into Birmingham city centre. Birmingham International Railway Station and Airport are minutes away offering rail and air links, as is the National Exhibition Centre (NEC).

Set within 148 acres of landscaped gardens the Park maintains nature walks, two beehives and a flower garden as well as encouraging tenants to use public transport, walking and cycling routes. There is also an on-site cafe and newsagent as well as catering vans that deliver to the door. A selection of health and fitness classes run throughout the week, including pilates and relaxation.

== History ==
The first phase of the Park was developed by Arlington in 1988 and comprised just seven buildings.

In 1992, Princess Anne officially opened the Birmingham Business Park's Waterside Centre, which houses management office, shops, cafes, newsagents, dry cleaners and a nursery. The same year, future Prime Minister Tony Blair also visited the site, accompanied by then Labour Party leader Neil Kinnock, to launch his election campaign for Prime Minister.

Rob Large, director of the company that has asset managed the Park for the past five years, said: “Over the last 30 years, Birmingham Business Park has established itself as the region’s premiere out of town office park. It is home to global companies, which are leaders in their field and are helping create jobs and economic prosperity for the Greater Birmingham region.”

In 2014, Rolls-Royce Aero Engine Controls opened its new £60 million purpose-built research, design, development and manufacturing facility at Birmingham Business Park, where it employs 1,200 people.

== Companies ==
Birmingham Business Park houses corporate offices for many companies, and its range of high-profile occupiers include Rolls-Royce, Fujitsu, EE, Dunlop Tyres (HiQ), Atos, and IMI.
