= Ted Tuppen =

Graham Edward Tuppen CBE (born 1952) is the founder of Enterprise Inns (now called the Ei Group), one of the largest pub chains in the United Kingdom.

== Career ==
Trained as a chartered accountant with KPMG, Ted Tuppen undertook an MBA at Cranfield School of Management before becoming managing director of a private engineering business in 1981.

In 1991 he founded Enterprise Inns when he bought 368 pubs from the Bass Brewery and expanded the business though further acquisition into the largest chain of pubs in the UK.

In 2003 The Daily Telegraph named him "Entrepreneur of the Year". He was awarded the CBE in the New Year Honours List 2007.

Tuppen stood down as chief executive officer of Enterprise Inns in February 2014.

== Other interests ==
Tuppen owns a farm in Devon.

In 2007 he set up the Tuppen Charitable Trust, listed at Open Charities as 'Charitable giving to causes deemed by the trustees to merit support, focus on helping people to help themselves.'
