= Union of Workers in Industry, Garages, Construction Firms, Mines and Printers =

STRIGECOMI
- Union of Workers in Industry, Garages, Construction Firms, Mines and Printers
- Syndicat des Travailleurs des Industries, Garages, Enterprises de Constructions, Mines et Imprimeries
- Headquarters: Kigali, Rwanda
- Location: Rwanda
- Key people: Emmanuel Ntegekurora, president
- Affiliations: ITUC

The Union of Workers in Industry, Garages, Construction Firms, Mines and Printers (STRIGECOMI) is a trade union in Rwanda. It is affiliated with the International Trade Union Confederation.
