= Payday loans in the United Kingdom =

Payday loans in the United Kingdom are typically small value (up to £1,500) and for short periods. Payday loans are often used as a term by members of the public (and commentators) generically to refer to all forms of high-cost short-term credit (HCSTC) including instalment loans, e.g. 3–9 month products, rather than just loans provided until the next pay day.

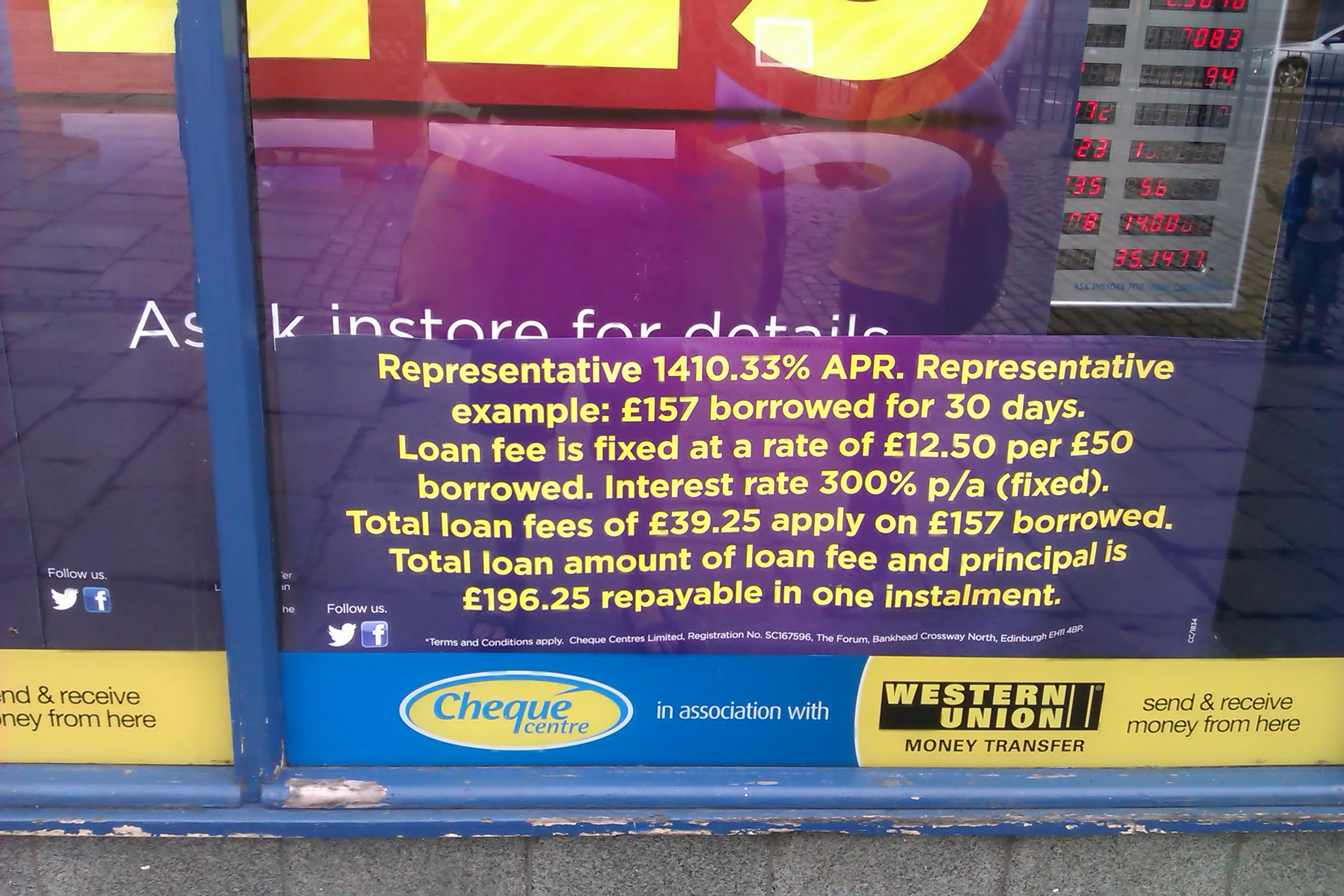
Shop window in Aberdeen, August 2012, showing an APR of 1,410.33%

== Market overview ==
The provision of payday (HCSTC) loans is overseen by the UK's Financial Conduct Authority. FCA data sizes the UK market, in the twelve months to 2018, at 5.4 million loans per year. This is a significant reduction from 2013, before FCA regulation of the sector, when the market was approximately 10 million loans a year. In terms of value the FCA sizes the market with consumers borrowing approximately £1.3 billion a year, making the average loan size approximately £250.

The market is concentrated. In 2018 the FCA identified 88 firms providing loans; however, 85% of loans were provided by just ten players. Most of the players are members of the trade association, the Consumer Finance Association.

== Customer profile ==
In 2018 the FCA published its Financial Lives research. This gave insight into customers of different product types. Payday loan and instalment loan customers tend to be predominantly young, overindexing in the 25–34 year old age group. These borrowers tend to live in rented properties or with parents and are more likely to be in financial difficulties. They are less likely to have a degree and are generally low income.

== Regulation ==
=== Early regulation (pre-2014) ===
Under the Consumer Credit Act 1974, lenders were required to hold a licence from the UK Office of Fair Trading (OFT) to offer consumer credit. The Consumer Credit Act 2006 explicitly required the OFT to consider irresponsible lending in its evaluation of whether a lender was fit to hold a licence. Advertising of payday lending is subject to the Consumer Credit (Advertisements) Regulations 2004, which requires that the "typical APR" must be stated in adverts meeting certain criteria, such as adverts which indicate that credit will be given to customers who may otherwise find access to credit restricted. Advertising is regulated by the Advertising Standards Authority (ASA), and there have been several cases of the ASA upholding complaints against advertising by payday lenders.

In June 2010 the OFT published a "review of high-cost credit," concluding that changes could be made to the industry itself, but that "more radical approaches would be required if the Government or others wanted to tackle the wider social, economic and financial context in which high-cost credit markets exist."

In March 2013 the OFT published an update regarding the industry. It was highly critical, giving the 50 leading lenders just 60 days to address the issues raised or risk losing their licences. In particular, it cited "a failure to work out whether people could afford the loans, aggressive debt collection practices, a failure to explain how repayments are collected, and a lack of sufficient forbearance for those who cannot afford the repayments." It referred the market to the Competition Commission for "deep-rooted problems in how payday loan companies compete."

=== FCA regulation and the price cap (2014–2015) ===
On 1 April 2014, responsibility for regulating consumer credit transferred from the OFT to the Financial Conduct Authority. In the first five months of FCA regulation, the number of loans and the amount borrowed dropped by 35%.

In November 2014, the FCA confirmed price cap rules for high-cost short-term credit, which came into effect on 2 January 2015. The cap has three components:

1. An interest rate cap of 0.8% per day. For all high-cost short-term credit loans, interest and fees must not exceed 0.8% per day of the amount borrowed.
2. Fixed default fees capped at £15. If borrowers do not repay their loans on time, default charges must not exceed £15. Interest on unpaid balances and default charges must not exceed the initial rate.
3. Total cost cap of 100%. Borrowers must never have to pay back more in fees and interest than the amount borrowed.

In July 2017, the FCA published its review of the price cap and the wider high-cost credit market. The review found that 760,000 borrowers in the HCSTC market were saving a total of £150 million per year as a result of the cap, that firms were much less likely to lend to customers who could not afford to repay, and that debt charities were seeing far fewer clients with debt problems linked to high-cost short-term credit. The FCA decided to maintain the cap at its existing level.

=== Market contraction (2018–present) ===
Since the introduction of the price cap, a number of major HCSTC lenders have exited the market, largely as a result of rising volumes of compensation claims for historic unaffordable lending. Wonga, formerly the UK's largest payday lender, entered administration in August 2018 after a surge in customer compensation claims overwhelmed the business. Enova International's UK brands QuickQuid and On Stride Financial closed in October 2019, and Dollar Financial Group's UK operation, The Money Shop, stopped trading in June 2019 after a similar surge in complaints. Curo Transatlantic Limited, which operated the Wageday Advance brand, entered administration in February 2019.

By 2024, the FCA reported that the high-cost credit sector overall had shrunk by almost £3 billion of lending since 2019, with more than 250 firms exiting the market across all high-cost credit segments.

== Advertising ==
=== Google ===
In July 2016, Google declared that advertising of payday loans would no longer be possible on its platform; however, this implementation was limited in the UK. While in some countries the new search policy prevented ads for loans with an annual percentage rate of 36% or more, in the UK the only limitation was banning ads with a repayment period of 60 days or less from the date of issue. This meant that, while loans of one or two months were not advertised, a number of lenders moved into instalment loans of 3–12 months duration as an alternative to payday loans.

== Brokers ==
Until FCA regulations were enforced on the industry in 2015, brokers used to include a broker fee, which was often payable upfront; meaning the applicant had to pay a fee merely to apply for an advertised loan, in addition to the high rate of interest. The OFT urged the government to tighten restrictions on payday loans.

== Criticism ==
There has been considerable criticism of the short-term loans market in the UK. Vince Cable MP said in 2008 that "the growing popularity of these kinds of short-term loans highlights the problems stemming from the credit crunch and unsustainable levels of personal debt in the UK." Chris Tapp of debt charity Credit Action said in mid-2008: "Over the past year, payday loans have become an issue in the UK, and the growth in people who have such a loan and have problems has been notable in the last six months."

Credit Action made a complaint to the OFT that payday lenders were placing advertisements on social network website Facebook which broke advertising regulations. Its main complaint was that the APR was either not displayed at all or not displayed prominently enough, which is clearly required by UK advertising standards.

In 2010 a campaign organised by pressure group Compass to "end legal loan sharking" and apply interest rate caps in the "high cost credit sector" saw over 200 MPs sign an Early Day Motion by April 2011. Other motions on the subject have been made in previous years, and groups such as Debt on our Doorstep have previously highlighted the issue.

The writer Carl Packman has criticised the regulation of the industry. Packman says: "given the regulatory landscape currently in force we have to trust [lenders] on their word that they follow a self-defeating business model ... Indeed payday lenders break their promise on responsible lending all the time."

The widely criticised payday lender Wonga.com was one of the biggest finance firms in Britain. Wonga faced widespread criticism over its interest rates, allegedly heavy-handed debt collection methods and its £24 million shirt sponsorship deal with Newcastle United football club that some say tempted impressionable young fans to get into debt. There was also concern over evidence it had allowed children to borrow cash. Although under-18s are banned from taking out loans with the firm, young people found ways to convince Wonga's "automated, real-time risk and decision system" that they were eligible for its 4,214 per cent APR loans. In 2012 the company became the target of identity thieves, with hundreds of cases of UK individuals being chased by the company for repayment of loans they had never applied for.

In 2013 payday broker Cash Lady was widely criticised over an advertising campaign which featured Kerry Katona. Following complaints to the ASA in May 2013, Cash Lady adverts were re-edited to remove the phrase 'Fast Cash for Fast Lives'. The ASA believed this implied that payday loans would help fund a high-flying celebrity lifestyle. In July 2013, Katona declared bankruptcy for the second time, and was dropped by Cash Lady. One month later the ASA ruled that Cash Lady could no longer use Katona in adverts, as she was too heavily associated in people's minds with debt.

In January 2014 247Moneybox along with other payday lenders was accused by the consumer group Which? of using "excessive" default fees to cut their headline rates of interest. Which? found that "Ten of 17 leading payday lenders we looked at have default fees of £20 or more, and four charged £25 and above". Since January 2015 the FCA has capped default fees that can be charged for a missed payment to £15 and the total amount a borrower has to repay cannot exceed 100% of the amount borrowed, inclusive of all fees and interest.

== See also ==
- Payday loan
- Wonga.com
- Subprime lending
- Consumer Credit Act 1974
