= Consumers, Estate Agents and Redress Act 2007 =

Act of the Parliament of the United Kingdom

Consumers, Estate Agents and Redress Act 2007 (Note: Section 67.)
- Act of Parliament
- Parliament of the United Kingdom
- Long title: An Act to make provision for the establishment of the National Consumer Council and its functions; to make provision for the abolition of other consumer bodies; to make provision about the handling of consumer complaints by certain providers; to make provision requiring certain providers to be members of redress schemes in respect of consumer complaints; to amend the Estate Agents Act 1979; to make provision about the cancellation of certain contracts concluded away from business premises; and for connected purposes.
- Citation: 2007 c. 17
- Introduced by: Lord Truscott
- Territorial extent: England and Wales; Scotland; Northern Ireland; (Note: Section 65.)

Dates
- Royal assent: 19 July 2007
- Commencement: Various (Note: Section 66.)
Other legislation
Amends	Estate Agents Act 1979; Water Industry Act 1991; Postal Services Act 2000

Status: Amended

History of passage through Parliament

Text of statute as originally enacted

Revised text of statute as amended

The Consumers, Estate Agents and Redress Act 2007 (c. 17) is an act of the Parliament of the United Kingdom.

== Background ==
Before the act was passed, two thirds of estate agents fell under the Ombudsman for Estate Agents, a voluntary scheme set up by the industry.

== Provisions ==
The Property Ombudsman's scheme is an official redress scheme under the act. Letting agencies are not required to belong to a scheme under the act.

The act also established Consumer Focus, replacing Energywatch, Postwatch and the National Consumer Council, as a public body to represent consumers.
