= Energy switching services in the UK =

Power suppliers price comparison service

Energy switching services are companies that have come to exist since the EU began deregulating the gas and electricity markets, to open them to competition, in 1996. Progress has been uneven across member countries, but in the UK there is now open competition among suppliers. Pricing structures and special offers are often complicated enough that it's not obvious which supplier and tariff will be best value for a consumer. This has provided an opportunity for specialist price comparison services. These are chiefly offered by companies who will manage a change to a different supplier and tariff, as well as advising on the best one. These companies primarily operate over the Web, although some also offer a telephone service.

== Regulation ==
Energy switching companies usually operate on a commission model, where they are paid a flat fee by a supplier for each customer that they persuade to switch. This has been the cause of some controversy. In order to ensure that advice remains impartial, energywatch, the UK gas and electricity watchdog, operates a voluntary code of conduct. To be accredited under the code, switching companies must satisfy Energywatch that:

1. They are independent of gas and electricity suppliers, do not accept advertisements, and state where they receive commission
2. They include like for like price comparisons for all currently available tariffs for all licensed suppliers (for gas, electricity and dual fuel)
3. They run their own website and use their own tariff database and calculator
4. The payment methods offered include standard credit by cash/cheque, monthly and quarterly direct debit, and prepayment meter
5. They must list prices from no fewer than five of the cheapest suppliers, and the prices must include VAT
6. They provide, or direct customers towards, information on quality of service issues and energy efficiency programmes
7. They provide accurate price comparisons and state when prices were last updated.

== See also ==
- Price comparison service
- uSwitch

== References and external links ==
- "Complete Energywatch code of conduct" (PDF). (257 KiB)
- Price comparison services, energywatch
- Gas and electricity price comparison services, Business Advisory Service
- Business Utility Comparison Website
