= Financial Services Act 2010 =

The Financial Services Act 2010 (c. 28) is an Act of the Parliament of the United Kingdom which regulates bonuses paid to employees of banks.

It was announced on 27 September 2009 by Prime Minister Gordon Brown on The Andrew Marr Show on BBC One. Brown said that the new law would be included in the next Queen's speech and was the result of talks at the G20 summit in Pittsburgh where other countries were looking at similar action. He also said that the Act's purpose would be to ensure that bankers after the global economic crisis do not go back to "business as usual".

The overall purpose of the Act is "to improve levels of confidence in the banking sector by limiting its losses and by supporting its economic revival.

The Act received Royal assent on 8 April 2010." It came into effect on 8 June 2010.

The Act was called in 2010 "a milestone with regard to the regulation of the financial sector in the UK."

== Provisions ==
The Act has amongst its several provisions:

1. to require rules for remuneration of "authorised persons," (Para. 11)
2. to include penalties for banks that do not follow a set of standards for methods of remuneration, and a "resolution plan," (Para. 12, 14)
3. to prohibit or to "require disclosure of," Short selling. (Para. 13)

In particular, the remuneration provisions are designed to reduce systemic risk, or "risk culture".

== See also ==
- Financial Services Authority
