= General Consumer Council for Northern Ireland =

Northern Irish public body

The General Consumer Council for Northern Ireland (GCCNI) was created by the Government in 1985 and is funded by the Department for the Economy (DfE). The body aims to represent consumers' interests.

It is designated by the Secretary of State as being able to bring a super-complaint to the OFT:
