= Consumer Council for Water =

Non-departmental public body

Agency overview
- Formed: 1 October 2005
- Preceding agency: WaterVoice
- Jurisdiction: England and Wales
- Headquarters: 23 Stephenson Street, Birmingham
- Agency executive: Rob Wilson, chair
- Parent department: Department for Environment, Food and Rural Affairs
- Website: www.ccwater.org.uk

The Consumer Council for Water (CCW) is a non-departmental public body whose sponsor department is Defra. CCW is independent of both the regulator, Ofwat, and the water companies.

CCW represents the interests of water and sewerage consumers in England and Wales. The organisation also provides impartial advice and advocacy for aggrieved customers. It has a remit to support both household customers of water companies and business customers of licensed retailers.

The head office is in the Government hub at 23 Stephenson Street, Birmingham. There is also an office in the government hub, Tŷ William Morgan, in Cardiff.

In March 2010, CCW added an online Consumer Support site where users can have their own questions/enquiries answered which can be accessed via its website.

In 2021, CCW undertook an independent review of water affordability support for Ministers in England and Wales.
