= Consumer Direct =

Consumer Direct was a UK Government-funded call centre and website service providing basic consumer advice in the United Kingdom. Following a review by government in 2010, Consumer Direct ceased to operate in March 2012 with its role being handed to the Citizens Advice consumer service. The new service operates using the same telephone number and provides the same level of advice as Consumer Direct did.

Consumer Direct's intention was to make such basic advice available to everyone regardless of the area in which they live.

Previously, provision of consumer advice services varied, with some local Councils operating extensive services with several staff; and others relying on other local advice services such as the Citizens Advice Bureau.

The service operated via a standardised national telephone number and by e-mail. Simpler complaints were dealt with directly; more complex matters that may require direct intervention or indicate some criminality were passed on to the relevant organisation (usually the relevant local Trading Standards office) as a referral. The website also provided a number of advice sheets.

Trading Standards offices were notified of all complaints relating to a trader based in their area. It was expected that this would assist in identifying problem traders more quickly.

Data was transmitted on a secure network using a standardised xml format which assists automated uploading of the information into local databases and eventually into the proposed eTSN (electronic Trading Standards Network). The eTSN never progressed.

== Abolition ==
Consumer Direct closed on 31 March 2012 with its functions being passed to Citizens Advice. The Citizens Advice consumer service provides email and phone advice as well as self-help material through its website.
