= Office of Fair Trading =

British government department, 1973–2014

Office of Fair Trading Welsh: Swyddfa Fasnachu Teg

Non-ministerial government department overview
- Formed: 21 September 1973; 53 years ago
- Dissolved: 1 April 2014
- Superseding Non-ministerial government department: Competition and Markets Authority
- Jurisdiction: United Kingdom
- Headquarters: Fleetbank House, 2–6 Salisbury Square, London, EC4Y 8JX

The Office of Fair Trading (OFT) was a non-ministerial government department of the United Kingdom, established by the Fair Trading Act 1973, which enforced both consumer protection and competition law, acting as the United Kingdom's economic regulator. The intention was for the OFT to make markets work well for consumers, ensuring vigorous competition between fair-dealing businesses and prohibiting unfair practices such as rogue trading, scams, and cartels. Its role was modified and its powers changed by the Enterprise Act 2002.

The Department for Business, Innovation and Skills (BIS) announced reforms to the consumer protection and competition regimes. Under the provisions of the Enterprise and Regulatory Reform Act 2013, the Competition and Markets Authority (CMA) was established on 1 April 2014, combining many of the functions of the OFT and the Competition Commission and superseding both.

Regulation of the consumer credit sector passed from the OFT to the new Financial Conduct Authority (FCA) from April 2014.

== Role ==
The majority of the OFT's work consisted of analysing markets, enforcing consumer and competition law, merger control, licensing and supervisory work (of consumer credit, estate agency, anti money-laundering supervision), advocacy, delivering information, education programmes and campaigns to business and consumers.

The OFT investigated markets to see whether they were working well for consumers and customers. Where appropriate, studies led to market investigation references to the Competition Commission, to enforce action, consumer awareness campaigns or to recommendations to government, which were published.

Showing how competitive markets that work well are important for consumers, fair dealing businesses and economic performance; explaining its decisions transparently; promoting compliance by explaining to business what the law is and how the OFT will apply it; promoting consumer awareness and confidence; coordinating effectively with enforcement partners locally, nationally and internationally, and advising government on how to achieve the most effective regime for competition and consumers.

== Structure ==
The OFT worked under a structure arranged by markets rather than legislation with a Services, Infrastructure and Public Markets group and a Goods and Consumer group. Officials specialising in the different legal and regulatory regimes worked closely together in each of these two groups. This enabled the OFT to look more easily at whole markets and to use all the tools available to improve them if they were not operating effectively.

The OFT used consumer and competition enforcement, market studies and references, education and communication in appropriate combination. These market sector groups sat alongside other OFT groups, mergers, and cartels and criminal enforcement. The OFT was situated off Fleet Street, near Blackfriars station. It was next to St Bride's Church.

=== Markets and Policies Initiatives ===
Based on expanded powers granted under the Enterprise Act 2002, the OFT explored how different market sectors operate, in order to help markets work well. It sometimes researched one particular market in detail or, for example, how codes of practice or professional rules operated across different markets in a range of businesses.

The results of the research, which were published, helped the OFT to assess what action, if any, needed to be taken to protect consumers' interests. They could recommend stronger enforcement, or a change in the regulations, or suggest an awareness raising campaign for consumers (but will not always recommend intervention and when this is the case, will ensure that any non intervention decision is well informed and open to public scrutiny).

In 2006, the OFT restructured in response to Treasury proposals for splitting the department into separate consumer and competition regulators. The OFT argued that to protect consumers effectively, it had to be able to use both consumer law and competition law approaches in a holistic fashion. Moving away from division by legislative area, the OFT created divisions based on market sector.

These officials are supported by a dedicated economics branch also including statisticians and financial analysts (the Office of the Chief Economist), a legal specialist, and a policy advisory branch.

== Cases ==
=== Credit card charges ===
In May 2006, the OFT investigated the charges being imposed on customers of credit card companies. In its report, the OFT confirmed these charges were unlawful as they amounted to a penalty, rather than the actual losses suffered by the companies. It said it would be prepared to investigate any charge over £12 (£16 for Egg credit card accounts) indicating that £12 would not be a "fair and acceptable charge" itself.

The OFT said it would be up to a court to determine such an amount based on the established legal precedent that the only recoverable cost would be actual costs incurred, i.e., liquidated damages.

The credit card companies did not produce evidence of their actual costs to the OFT, instead insisting their charges are in line with clear policy and information provided to customers. Charges have been as much as £38 per item, which campaigners argue is well beyond the cost of sending a computerised letter.

=== Deceptive websites ===
In 2009, after customers complained to OFT about deceptive practices by two websites operated by a man in the state of California that misrepresented themselves as being British, it coordinated actions with the U.S. Federal Trade Commission, which began an enforcement action. Two years later a consent decree required the companies to end those practices and represent their location honestly.

=== Debt management companies ===
In September 2010, the OFT sent warnings to 129 firms after its review of debt management companies found widespread problems, with firms putting profits ahead of customer care. Since it issued that warning, 87 firms have surrendered their licenses.

=== Transfer of cash ISAs ===
In March 2010, Consumer Focus submitted a super complaint to the OFT raising concerns that transferring cash ISAs were taking too long and there were arbitrary rules preventing transfers into some of the most attractive accounts and that interest rates were not sufficiently transparent.

The OFT responded in June 2011, with a number of recommendations to ensure that transfers of cash ISAs work better and that there is greater transparency of interest rates. This included the following agreements from cash ISA provider to:

- Comply with new industry guidelines to complete end to end transfers within 15 working days
- Provide personalised interest rate information on cash ISA statements delivered in electronic and/or paper form

=== Reckitt Benckiser ===
In April 2011, the OFT fined Reckitt Benckiser £10.2 million after it found that it had abused its dominant position in the market for the National Health Service (NHS) supply of alginate and antacid heartburn medicines. The OFT found that Reckitt Benckiser abused its dominant position by withdrawing and de-listing Gaviscon Original Liquid from the NHS prescription channel in 2005.

=== Groupon ===
In March 2012, the OFT accepted undertakings from "daily deals" company MyCityDeal, which trades as Groupon, to change some of its trading practices following an OFT investigation. The investigation found widespread examples of Groupon's practices that breached consumer protection regulations.

The OFT had specific concerns over practices involving reference pricing, advertising, refunds, unfair terms, and the diligence of its interactions with merchants. Groupon engaged openly and constructively throughout the investigation and signed undertakings that it will change its practices to comply with the law.

=== Hotel online booking ===
In September 2012, the OFT commenced an investigation into the hotel online booking sector. The complainant, a small online travel agent, Skoosh, claimed that the hotels it bought room bookings from were under pressure from other resellers to maintain minimum prices. On 31 July 2012, the OFT issued a Statement of Objections against Booking.com, Expedia, and Intercontinental Hotels.

In the OFT's provisional view the parties had infringed competition law. In January 2014, the OFT accepted commitments proposed by the defendant parties in lieu of any fines. The OFT's Rasmussen acknowledged there was a chance the set up could lead to further monopoly, but he said the OFT would be monitoring movements in the market.

In March 2014, the price comparison site, Skyscanner, challenged the OFT's decision with the United Kingdom's Competition Appeal Tribunal.

=== Supply of ICT to the public sector ===
In a "parting shot", one week prior to the transfer of the OFT's responsibilities to the CMA, the Office recommended that an investigation into market conditions in the public sector ICT market should be undertaken.

== Reputation ==
The OFT was criticised for being ineffective and for many of its investigations leading to no action, in contrast to the more vigorous approach of United States (United States Department of Justice Antitrust Division) and European Union (Directorate-General for Competition) regulators. Criticism has been levied, among others, in the cases of:

- Supermarkets
- Oil companies retail sales / petrol – in October 2008, UK Prime Minister Gordon Brown threatened oil companies with an OFT investigation unless lower oil prices were passed to consumers; this was despite several OFT investigations in the past giving the industry a clean bill of health.

The National Audit Office issued a report in March 2009 on the OFT's competition enforcement work which indicated progress in 7 out of 10 objectives, but also concluded:

...So whilst the OFT has improved the value for money it provides, there remains scope for further improvement.

According to the same report, in 2007 to 2008 the OFT estimated that its competition enforcement work led to direct savings to consumers worth £77m per year and that its market studies work had saved consumers £98 million in 2007 to 08; the OFT costs for these areas of work in the same year were approximately £26 million of its £78 million expenditure in 2007 to 2008.

== Super complaints ==
The following bodies and companies were designated by the Secretary of State as being able to bring a super-complaint to the OFT:

- The Campaign for Real Ale Limited (CAMRA)
- The Consumer Council for Water
- The Consumers' Association (trading as "Which?")
- The General Consumer Council for Northern Ireland (GCCNI)
- The National Association of Citizens Advice Bureaux (NACAB)
- The National Consumer Council (trading as "Consumer Focus")

== See also ==
- Bundeskartellamt
- Competition regulator
- Conseil de la Concurrence
- Consumer Credit Act 1974
- Consumers' Association
- Federal Trade Commission
- Financial Services Authority
- Independent school fee fixing scandal
- Merger control
- UK default charges controversy
