= Citizens Advice =

British charitable organisation

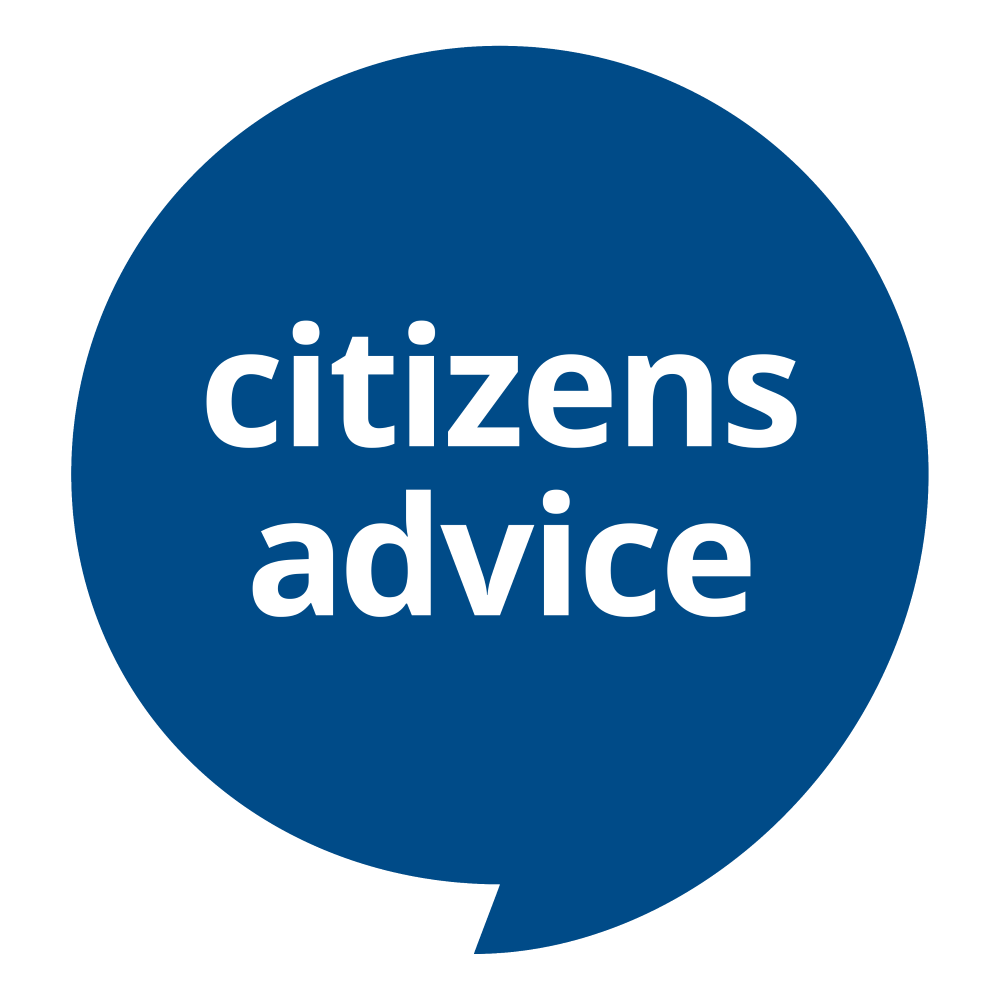
- The English language Citizens Advice logo following a rebrand in 2015
- Founded: 1939
- Type: Charitable organisation
- Registration no.: 279057
- Purpose: "to provide advice that helps people to overcome their problems and come together to campaign on big issues when their voices need to be heard"
- Location: Head office: Citizens Advice, 3rd Floor, 1 Easton Street, London, WC1X 0DW
- Region served: United Kingdom 316 branches nationally.
- Method: Telephone, face to face, e-mail, webchat
- Key people: Clare Moriarty (Chief Executive)
- Income: £99 million (2016/2017)
- Employees: 7,000
- Volunteers: 21,600 (2015)
- Website: citizensadvice.org.uk

Citizens Advice (previously Citizens Advice Bureau and also known as Cyngor ar Bopeth (Note: Cyngor ar Bopeth translates as 'advice on everything') in Welsh) is a British independent organisation specialising in giving people free and impartial information and advice. Areas of advice offered include benefits, debt and money, consumer, housing, work, energy and discrimination.

The twin aims of the Citizens Advice service are "to provide the advice people need for the problems they face" and secondly "to improve the policies and principles that affect people's lives". This research and campaigns agenda also known as "social policy" is more preventative in nature and designed to stop problems arising in the first place.

Citizens Advice organisations emerged in the 1930s linked to the emergence of a fledgling social welfare service and the outbreak of World War II. Public funding for the organisation was cut following the war but restored during the 1960s and a government grant in 1973 allowed the National Association of Citizens Advice Bureaux (NACAB) to expand the charity. Citizens Advice has grown to be the largest independent advice provider in the United Kingdom. There are also a number of Citizens Advice organisations that base themselves on the United Kingdom advice charity mainly in parts of the Commonwealth including Western Australia, New Zealand, and Gibraltar.

In 2013 the Citizens Advice Adviceguide website was visited by one third of United Kingdom's online population and Citizens Advice's own research shows that four in ten of the British population contact Citizens Advice at some point during their lives. In 2014 Citizens Advice celebrated its 75th anniversary and in 2015 the charity was named Charity of the Year at the 2015 Charity Awards. During the ten year leadership of the former Chief Executive Gillian Guy Citizens Advice expanded its remit taking on the contract for the Witness Service and the face-to-face advice element of Pension Wise.

== History ==
=== Origins ===
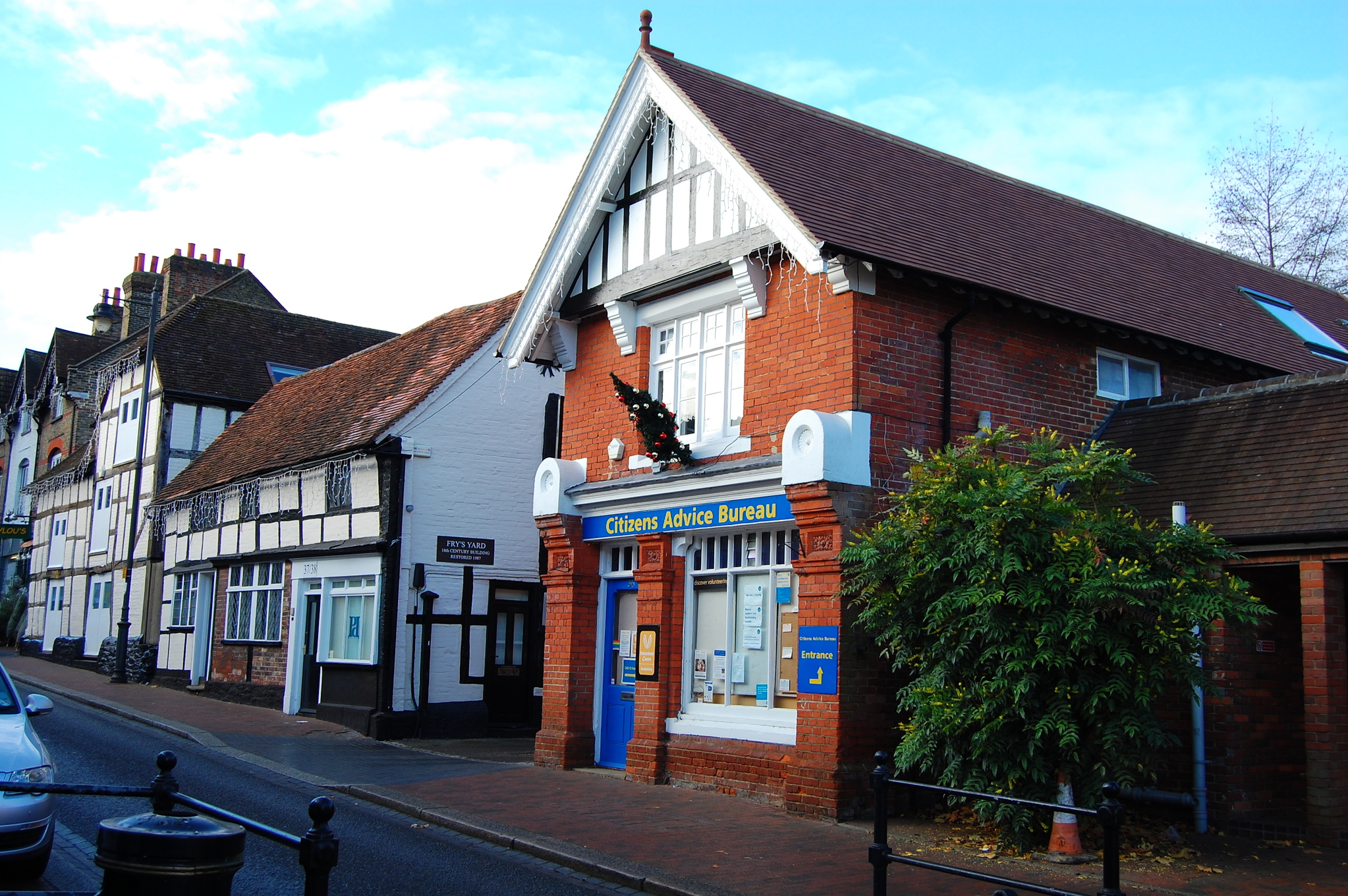
Godalming Citizens Advice (pictured) in Godalming, Surrey, is one of 316 Citizens Advice offices in the United Kingdom.

The origins of the modern Citizens Advice service can be traced back to the Betterton Report on Public Assistance from 1924. This report recommended that advice centres should be set up to offer members of the public advice to help them with their problems. During the 1930s, as preparations and plans were drawn up for the possibility of war, the role that the voluntary sector should have was determined. The National Council for Social Service (NCSS) called a meeting in 1938 in which plans to establish "Citizens Aid Bureaux" were devised in the event of war. The first 200 bureaux opened on 4 September 1939, four days after World War II started. Many of these initial bureaux were run by "people of standing" in the community. In The Story of The Citizens' Advice Bureaux Brasnett states that the typical bureau would include "a committee chairman the editor of a respected county paper, as treasurer a local bank manager; and among the members the manager of the employment exchange, an estate agent who was able to lend part of a house for offices". Brasnett also describes a range of groups running provincial bureau including Toc H, Rotary Clubs and Soroptomist Clubs. Brasnett states in The Story of the Citizens' Advice Bureau that these first bureau were mainly offshoots of established organisations in London and other large provincial cities. These organisations included the Charity Organisation Society (now the Family Action) and the London Council of Social Service, the Liverpool Personal Service Society, the City of Glasgow Society of Social Service, the Birmingham Citizens' Society (now the Birmingham Council of Social Service). By 1942, there were 1,074 bureaux in a wide range of improvised offices such as cafes, church halls, private homes and air-raid shelters. Sheffield set up in the cloisters of Sheffield Cathedral after its premises were bombed during World War II and another bureau worked in Chislehurst Caves. Mobile offices also became important in ensuring that people could access advice. Many of the issues dealt with during that time were directly related to the war. These included the tracing of missing servicemen or prisoners of war, evacuations, pensions and other allowances. The Independent describes Citizens Advice at this time as "clearing houses for family and personal problems that abound from war conditions", with common issues being lost ration books and debt issues as men went off to fight in World War II.

=== Post-war history ===
Many war time bureaux closed at the end of the war, although it was apparent that there was still a need for the services that had been established. A particular problem was the chronic housing shortage in the years immediately following the end of the war. In the 1950s, the funding was cut and by 1960 there were only 415 bureaux. The Citizens Advice service continued due to charitable support from groups such as the Nuffield Foundation, Carnegie Trust and the Joseph Rowntree Foundation. In 1972, The Citizens Advice service became independent. Before then, the national organisation was part of NCSS (National Council of Social Services) and most bureaux were run by the local CVS (Council for Voluntary Service). In 1973, the government funded NACAB, the National Association of Citizens Advice Bureaux, to enlarge the network. The 1984 afternoon television drama series Miracles Take Longer depicted the type of cases that a 1980s branch would have to deal with. David Harker became CEO in 1997. He led Citizens Advice until 2010 and during that time oversaw a massive IT overhaul.

Since 2003, the operating name of the National Association of Citizens Advice Bureaux changed to Citizens Advice and Citizens Advice Cymru or Cyngor ar Bopeth in Wales. In the same year Citizens Advice became the first advice sector organisation to begin to audit the quality of their advice. In 2008/9, there were 416 member bureaux offering advice from over 3,300 locations in England and Wales and a further 22 bureaux in Northern Ireland all of which are independent charities. Despite the large number of volunteers working for the organisation, level of demand for the service often far outstrips resources. Citizens Advice has recently begun looking at ways to reach all members of the community through new mediums such as email advice and digital TV. Another initiative has been allowing university students to train as advisers to gain credits toward their degree. This was pioneered by a partnership between the University of Portsmouth and Portsmouth Citizens Advice Bureau and is also now available at Birmingham City University, University of Reading, University of Northampton, Glasgow Caledonian University, and University of Glasgow. Training as a Citizens Advice adviser can earn a person up to six months off a training contract if training as a solicitor.

=== Recent history ===
Gillian Guy became Chief Executive in 2010 and under her leadership a modernisation process took place which involved a rebrand of the Citizens Advice service and the introduction of new advice methods including webchat. She was succeeded by Clare Moriarty in April 2021.

At the start of Guy's tenure Citizens Advice faced a budget cut of 9% however finances have recently improved with the charity increasing its income from £62m to £77m between 2013 and 2015. This is largely a result of Citizens Advice taking over roles that were previously performed by the quangos the Office of Fair Trading and Consumer Futures. During 2012 and 2013 Citizens Advice adopted an Equality Strategy known as 'Stand Up For Equality' which aims to embed an equality agenda in all work Citizens Advice does. In 2014 Citizens Advice took over the role that Victim Support played in supporting court witnesses. This contract is worth £24m. This service was renamed the Witness Service. Also in 2014 Citizens Advice took over the role of Consumer Futures (previously Consumer Focus) which represents consumers of regulated industries (energy and the postal service). In 2015 Citizens Advice began to deliver Pension Wise guidance. In 2015 Citizens Advice adopted a rebrand dropping the 'Bureau' from its name. The rebrand cost £1 million which includes £215,000 for research and development, £450,000 in financial support to implement the changes and £300,000 to cover local costs such as posters and materials. The rebrand was criticised by Steve Johnson the chief executive officer of AdviceUK who described it as "facile". However, evidence from Citizens Advice focus groups found that while the charity was well known the brand was considered somewhat "tired" or "old fashioned".

In 2019–20, the organisation's revenues were £139.1 million.

In 2015 Citizens Advice piloted a webchat service allowing people to contact Citizens Advice advisers online both via online instant messenger service and via e-mail. Data from 2015 showed that 7% of all enquiries to Citizens Advice were through the webchat service and 80,000 webchat enquiries were answered.

In 2016 Citizens Advice was featured in a BBC documentary called Battling with Benefits. It explored the work of Bridgend Citizens Advice in Wales and their work on issues such as the bedroom tax, Job Seekers' Allowance "sanctions" and appeals for Employment Support Allowance and Personal Independence Payment in light of the Conservative Government's cuts to the social security system.

== Aims and principles ==
The Citizens Advice service in England and Wales, Northern Ireland, and Scotland is guided by four principles. These are:

- A free service
- Confidentiality
- Impartiality
- Independence

Although an independent and impartial organisation Citizens Advice has a peculiar relationship with Government in that it is dependent upon Government for funding but also acts as a high-profile critic of government policy. At a Citizens Advice conference in 1957 Lord Denning, then Lord Justice of Appeal described the complex relationship between Citizens Advice and the state describing how Citizens Advice was "supported indeed by the state, but not controlled by it; supported by local authorities but not controlled by them, and, I hope like the law, never to be controlled by any public authority".

All Citizens Advice Bureaux and workers for the bureaux must adhere to these principles, and bureaux must demonstrate that they adhere to these principles in order to retain membership of the national umbrella bodies. Citizens Advice state that their vision "is that everyone will be able to access free advice to find a way forward". They also state that their "charitable mission is to provide advice that helps people to overcome their problems and come together to campaign on big issues when their voices need to be heard".

== Funding ==
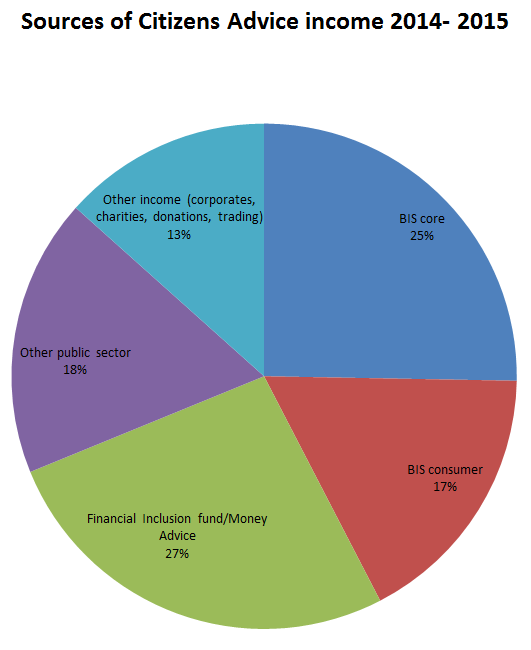
Citizens Advice funding sources for 2014/2015. The majority of Citizens Advice funding comes from government sources.

The trade publication Third Sector state that around 60% of Citizens Advice funding comes from government sources. It has been argued that there is a tension in the relationship between Citizens Advice and government as while the charity relies on government funding to survive it is most effective as a high-profile critic of government policy. Local bureaux received funding of £167m in 2014. Although Citizens Advice is a national charity local bureaux are responsible for raising their own funding. Some of this may come from 'The Big Lottery Fund' which distributes money raised through the National Lottery for 'good causes,' from local authorities or from other services such as the Legal Services Commission. Citizens Advice suffered cuts during the 2008 financial crisis and the Great Recession and over 100 Citizens Advice offices closed or were lost as a result of merger since 2009. Others resorted to reduced services. Some Councils have been forced to cut funding for Citizens Advice services and these cuts led to complaints that Citizens Advice was not meeting growing needs for its services during a period of high demand. Newcastle Citizens Advice faced a threat of closure in 2016 after Newcastle Council proposed large cuts to its funding. In February 2016, Derby City Council decided that it would no longer fund the city's Citizens Advice, leaving Derby as the only city in the UK not to have a Citizens Advice Service, according to its CEO.

Both Citizens Advice and Citizens Advice Scotland are registered charities and are financed partly by the Department for Business, Innovation and Skills, although both organisations are completely independent of central government. Member bureaux also pay heavily subsidised subscriptions for the services offered. They often receive significant funding by local authorities, and local solicitors may agree to provide limited legal advice pro bono. In 2013 the then Consumer Minister Jo Swinson announced a further £9.5m in order for the charity to champion consumer work and in 2015 Martin Lewis founder of Money Saving Expert donated £1m to Citizens Advice. In 2016 it was announced that the money Martin Lewis donated would be used to create a fund called the 'Martin Lewis Fund' and this money would be used to improve front line services.

== Giving advice ==
Citizens Advice give advice in areas such as:

- benefits including Universal Credit
- debt and money
- housing
- employment
- energy
- consumer
- family
- law and courts
- immigration

Citizens Advice calculated that in 2024-25 it helped 2.71 million people with one-to-one advice. There were also 51.7 million visits to their website.

Advice is available in the bureaux, but also in community venues, in people's homes, by phone, by e-mail and online both via a Webchat service and the Citizens Advice public site known as "Advice Guide". Figures from 2016 show that Citizens Advice has around 600 staff members in GP surgeries.

Telephone advice also known as Adviceline can be accessed in English and a bilingual service in Wales. One Citizens Advice page shows in real time what individuals are searching for on the website, what searches from the search engine Google caused an individual to reach the Citizens Advice page and what Citizens Advice website content is most popular. Citizens Advice also runs a consumer helpline to help with consumer issues. The most popular areas of enquiry are benefits and debt, with housing the third most popular enquiry area. Each Citizens Advice office operates differently. Some will have specialist staff that deal with certain cases such as debt or housing. Some operate a 'Gateway' system which means clients are booked for advice at a later appointment and other Citizens Advice offer 'drop in' Generalist Advice sessions. At some Citizens Advice offices solicitors may offer short appointments on a pro bono basis as a way of gaining clients.

Citizens Advice has a number of advice partnerships with organisations in areas including money and partnership with Macmillan to help those affected by cancer. Citizens Advice has a partnership with the housing advice charity Shelter called the National Homelessness Advice Service which is able to offer advisers specialist housing and homelessness advice. The partnership is funded by the Department for Communities and Local Government. From 2015 Citizens Advice offices have been used to deliver Pension Wise guidance. Citizens Advice research shows that 25% of those who visit for a Pension Wise appointment go on to ask Citizens Advice for further advice on debts, benefits or tax.

Citizens Advice also engages in preventative work in order to prevent problems arising in the first place. Citizens Advice is a charity funded by local Government which provides consumer education in Great Britain. There are 11 Consumer Empowerment Partnerships that work closely with Trading Standards. A financial capability agenda helps people to manage their money so as to not develop money problems in the first place. Citizens Advice also produces education resources to improve financial capability and consumer education. A Partnerships Intelligence Team works in order to support the work of regulators. One example of this is research on continuous payment authorities in order to help the Financial Conduct Authority better regulate them.

== Research and campaigns ==
The Citizens Advice service, both locally and nationally, also uses clients' problems as evidence to influence policy makers to review laws or administrative practices which cause undue difficulties to clients, in a process referred to as "Social Policy". At a national level Citizens Advice engages in policy research in order to recommend policy changes. Current research areas include mental health domestic abuse, problems in the private rented sector, welfare, work, pensions, energy policy and the postal service.

A public affairs team works to influence Government both in Westminster and the devolved institutions. There is also a Citizens Advice All-Party Parliamentary Group that provides a forum for Members of Parliament who are interested in the work of Citizens Advice. Citizens Advice produces constituency data that can be used by Parliamentarians to improve how they complete their own case work. Advice Trends data is published at a national and local level. Consumer Advice Trends data is also published as is data for Wales alone and data on the performance of energy suppliers and the postal service.

== Impact ==
Citizens Advice measures the impact of its advice across a range of areas. Citizens Advice research has calculated that for every £1 spent on the Citizens Advice service the Government saves £1.96 and £8.74 in wider economic and social benefits and £11.98 in benefit to individuals. Research shows that Citizens Advice affects the most disadvantaged in society with Citizens Advice clients five times more likely to live in poverty than the average member of the United Kingdom population. Citizen Advice's own research has also shown that volunteering has positive benefits in terms of helping people gain practical skills and improving mental health. Each year 31% of Citizens Advice's volunteers leave the service for paid employment and it has been calculated that the work of Citizens Advice volunteers is worth £111 million. Citizens Advice's campaigns work has had a number of successes including the Financial Conduct Authority capping payday loans. A Twitter hashtag #CABlive is used to publicise the work of Citizens Advice on social media.

== Advice and health improvement ==
Research conducted in 2016 found that 4 in 5 of Citizens Advice clients felt stressed, depressed or anxious and 3 in 5 clients felt their physical health had become worse as a result of their practical problem.

There is a growing body of evidence which shows that tackling practical problems through advice improves health and wellbeing. National Citizens Advice Impact research reports that 70% of clients said they felt less stressed and 46% said their physical health improve after advice. Of Citizens Advice clients experiencing long-term conditions, 57% said they were better able to manage their condition.

Citizens Advice has also investigated the impact that practical problems have on health professional's time. The research report "A Very General Practice" estimates that 19% of GP appointments are spent dealing with non-clinical problems. 98% of IAPT practitioners that responded to Citizens Advice research reported that they had dealt with a patient's non-health problems during an appointment in the past month and 57% reported the proportion of time they spend on non-health issues has increased compared to last year.

In 2016 Citizens Advice was appointed to the National Health and Wellbeing Alliance. Working with the Department of Health, NHS England, Public Health England and the 23 members of the Alliance, Citizens Advice uses its data and evidence to reduce health inequalities, which is one of the key aims of the Alliance.

== Governance ==
A Trustee Board provides strategic direction and vision for the organisation. The Chief Executive working with the Executive Team is responsible for delivering the board's vision.

Below the Trustee Board a number of committees exist:

- Chair's Committee
- Audit Risk Committee
- Equality Committee
- Cymru Committee
- Trustee Recruitment Committee
- Membership and Standards Committee
- Remuneration Committee
- Technology Committee

== Organisation ==
The Citizens Advice service is one of the largest volunteer organisations in the United Kingdom with 21,600 volunteers. The majority of these are part-time volunteer advisers, but the figure also includes trustees and administrators. While volunteers have varying levels of training, they are all required to receive basic training to ensure they fully understand the nature of the service including the four basic principles. Typically there will be a paid bureau manager, some paid advice session supervisors and in some cases some paid advisers. Some staff may be qualified to give specialist legal advice or to advise on immigration. Each Citizens Advice is an affiliated to the national organisation but they are managed and run locally. Many bureaux are also limited companies and may have a board of directors, who will also be the organisation's trustees. Bureaux throughout the United Kingdom have varying community needs and very different resources, and consequently offer different styles and levels of service. All bureaux in England, Wales and Northern Ireland are members of Citizens Advice, the operating name of The National Association of Citizens Advice Bureaux. Northern Ireland bureaux are also members of the Northern Ireland Association of Citizens Advice Bureaux (NIACAB). Bureaux in Scotland are members of Citizens Advice Scotland (CAS), part of the Scottish Association of Citizens Advice Bureaux. Citizens Advice holds an Annual Conference each year. In 2015 this was held at the University of Warwick.

Citizens Advice and Citizens Advice Scotland act as umbrella bodies for the bureaux in the UK. They provide access to information, training courses and consultancy services for all bureaux, and regularly audit individual bureaux against the requirements of their respective membership standards. All bureaux try to ensure their services are accessible to all sections of the community, so that provision can be made for the housebound, immigrant communities, rural inhabitants, elderly and disabled as appropriate. Membership of Citizens Advice gives each bureau access to the national information portal, known as AdviserNet and to internet access provided through a Virtual Private Network. Information on clients' problems and the advice offered to them is entered into the Casebook national database. Its predecessor system was Petra and before that CASE.

Citizens Advice has a number of diversity groups known as Self Organised Network Groups (SONGs). These include:

- National Black Workers' Group
- National Disabled Workers' Group
- National Lesbian Gay and Bisexual Group
- National Women's Group

=== Citizens Advice Scotland ===
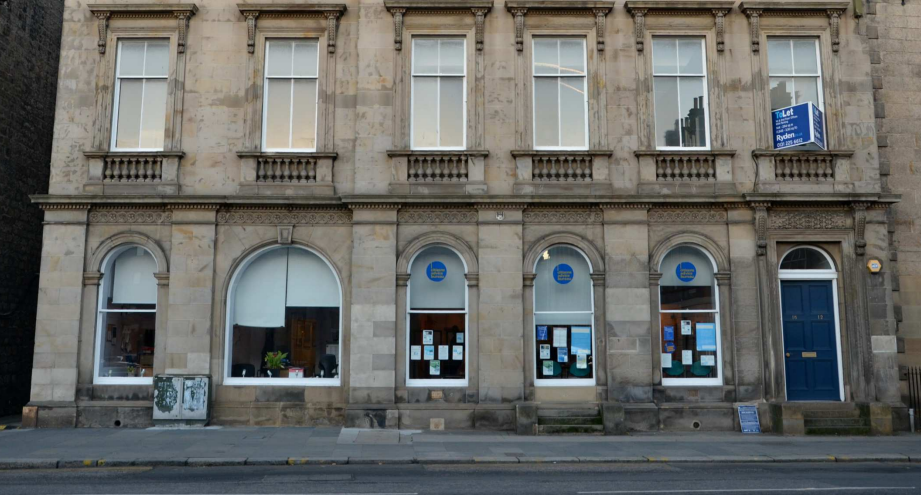
Leith Citizens Advice (pictured) is one of 61 local Citizens Advice offices serving Scotland.

Citizens Advice Scotland (CAS), formally the Scottish Association of Citizens Advice Bureaux (SACAB), is a registered charity. Based in Edinburgh it comprises 61 member bureaux, including a national helpline (Citizens Advice Direct). Together these free local and national services provide legal advice, practical help and information on consumer and political rights across the country. CAS provides central support to local bureaux with management, research, fundraising, IT support, training and campaigning. CAS launched a national helpline in 2005, called Citizens Advice Direct, staff were based in Glasgow city centre.

In 2012 a study showed that most of CAS's activity was the provision of advice across five areas: benefits, debt, employment, housing and relationship. In 2012, there were concerns that five of the bureaux in Glasgow might close, however they remained open after accepting a new funding offer. CAS has been registered as a charity since 3 August 1984, currently registered as a charitable company with the Office of the Scottish Charity Regulator (OSCR), Scottish charity number SC 016637. According to 2016 statistics Citizens Advice Scotland helped 300,000 clients and put £120 million into the pockets of people seeking help in 2015/16 and help reduce the amount owed by those seeking debt advice by £27 million.

=== Citizens Advice Northern Ireland ===
Citizens Advice Northern Ireland are now known as Community Advice. It is Northern Ireland's largest advice charity. There are advice services covering each council area. In Northern Ireland Citizens Advice advises over 95,000 people per year.

=== Citizens Advice Cymru ===
In Wales Citizens Advice Cymru has a network of 20 bureaux giving advice at 375 locations. According to the latest available statistics (2013/14) these bureau advised 134,000 clients and dealt with 337,000 advice issues. The Adviceline telephone service is bilingual and is able to offer advice in both English and Welsh.

== In other nations ==
Organisations modelled on Citizens Advice have been created in other nations outside of the United Kingdom. All of these organisations are autonomous and are not in any way controlled by the British organisation although some have adopted the branding of the British Citizens Advice. The Citizens Advice Bureau serving Western Australia has 10 branches of Citizens Advice Bureau and uses the same branding as the British charity. New Zealand has over 80 Citizens Advice Bureau branches throughout the North and South Island. There is also a Spanish Citizens Advice Bureau organisation aimed at helping British expats in Spain and a Gibraltan Citizens Advice Bureau. An unrelated organisation Citizens Advice International was established in 2004 to promote free advice services and to promote Citizens Advice organisations throughout the world.

== See also ==
- Citizens Advice outside the United Kingdom
- Law Centre
- Money Advice Service

== Notes and references ==
Notes
