= Citizens Advice outside the United Kingdom =

Citizens advice organisations based upon the United Kingdom advice charity can be found in Spain, Gibraltar, New Zealand, Australia and the Channel Islands.

Organisations based on the British Citizens Advice charity exist in a number of jurisdictions outside the United Kingdom. Although none of these organisations is controlled by the British charity, they adopt the branding and identity of Citizens Advice to varying degrees.

Some are members of Citizens Advice International, an umbrella organisation created in 2004 to "represent the interests of independent free advice-giving organisations around the world". It has 12 members. However, the membership of Citizens Advice International also includes other national advice organisations totally unrelated to the British Citizens Advice.

== Australia ==
There are citizens advice bureaus in a number of places in Australia.

In the state of Victoria they are now generally referred to as "community information and support services" rather than "Citizens Advice". Their umbrella and peak body is Community Information & Support Victoria (CISVic). Local centres are located at:

- Altona North
- Bendigo
- Boronia
- Box Hill
- Camberwell
- Chelsea
- Cobram
- Coburg
- Cranbourne
- Croydon
- Doncaster
- Epping
- Essendon
- Frankston
- Glen Huntly
- Greensborough
- Hampton East
- Hastings
- Laverton
- Lilydale
- Mentone
- Mornington
- Mt Waverly
- Narre Warren
- Oakleigh
- Port Melbourne
- Prahran
- Preston
- Ringwood
- Rosebud
- South Melbourne
- Springvale
- St Kilda
- Warrandyte
- West Heidelberg

In Western Australia there are the following CABs. There are currently 10 branches located at:

- Armadale
- Bunbury
- Busselton
- Fremantle
- Joondalup
- Kwinana
- Mandurah
- Midland
- Perth
- Rockingham

In Queensland there are Citizen Advice Bureaus in:

- Brisbane
- Gold Coast

The South Australian CAB is in Adelaide.

Legal Aid and free legal services to some extent augment Citizen Advice Bureaus in Australia.

== Channel Islands ==
The Channel Islands have citizens advice bureaux in Jersey and Guernsey.

== Gibraltar ==
The British territory of Gibraltar has a citizens advice bureau.

== Ireland ==
In Ireland they are at Ballina.

== New Zealand ==
The logo of CAB NZ

== Spain ==
A Spanish citizens advice organisation exists largely serving the British expat community in Spain. CAB Spain asks for voluntary donations through their website for anyone who wishes to support them with funding. All advice by telephone, email, Facebook or at the legal clinics is free. All the information provided on the website for guidance and information is free. CAB Spain, is however, not affiliated in any way with CAB in the UK, which is a registered UK charity and therefore totally free, unlike CAB Spain which does not receive any funding so self-funding.
