= Universal Credit =

Welfare benefit in the United Kingdom

Logo

Universal Credit is a United Kingdom–based social security payment. It is means-tested and is replacing and combining six benefits, for working-age households with a low income: income-related Employment and Support Allowance (ESA), income-based Jobseeker's Allowance (JSA), and Income Support; Child Tax Credit (CTC) and Working Tax Credit (WTC); and Housing Benefit. While Universal Credit replaced six working-age means-tested benefits, Council Tax Benefit was explicitly excluded from the reform and devolved to local government administration.

An award of UC is made up of different elements, which become payable to the claimant if relevant criteria apply: a standard allowance for singles or couples, child elements and disabled child elements for children in the household, housing cost element, childcare costs element, as well as elements for being a carer or for having limited capability to work-related activities, due to illness or disability.

The new policy was announced in 2010 at the Conservative Party annual conference by the Secretary of State for Work and Pensions, Iain Duncan Smith, who said it would make the social security system fairer to claimants and taxpayers. At the same venue the Welfare Reform Minister, Lord Freud, emphasised the scale of their plan, saying it was a "once in many generations" reform. A government white paper was published in November 2010. A key feature of the proposed new benefit was that unemployment payments would taper off as the recipient moved into work, not suddenly stop, thus avoiding a "cliff edge" that was said to "trap" people in unemployment.

Universal Credit was legislated for in the Welfare Reform Act 2012. In 2013, the new benefit began to be rolled out gradually to Jobcentres, initially focusing on new claimants with the least complex circumstances: single people who were not claiming for the cost of their accommodation.

There were problems with the early strategic leadership of the project and with the IT system on which Universal Credit relies. Implementation costs, initially forecast to be around £2 billion, later grew to over £12 billion.

More than three million recipients of the six older "legacy" benefits were expected to have transferred to the new system by 2017, but under current plans the full move will not be completed until at least 2028. The Department for Work and Pensions started full-scale migration in 2023 and by September 2024, all claimants other than claimants on income-based ESA or income-based ESA and housing benefit, will begin migrating to Universal Credit. As of December 2023, 6.3 million people across Great Britain were receiving Universal Credit and the total estimate cost of implementing the Universal Credit reached £2.928 billion in 2023.

One specific concern is that payments are made monthly, with a waiting period of at least five weeks (originally six) before the first payment, which can particularly affect claimants of Housing Benefit and lead to rent arrears (although claimants can apply for emergency loans paid more promptly). In May 2019, one million people were receiving less than their entitlement, often due to the repayment of loans given during the initial five-week wait period.

== Background ==
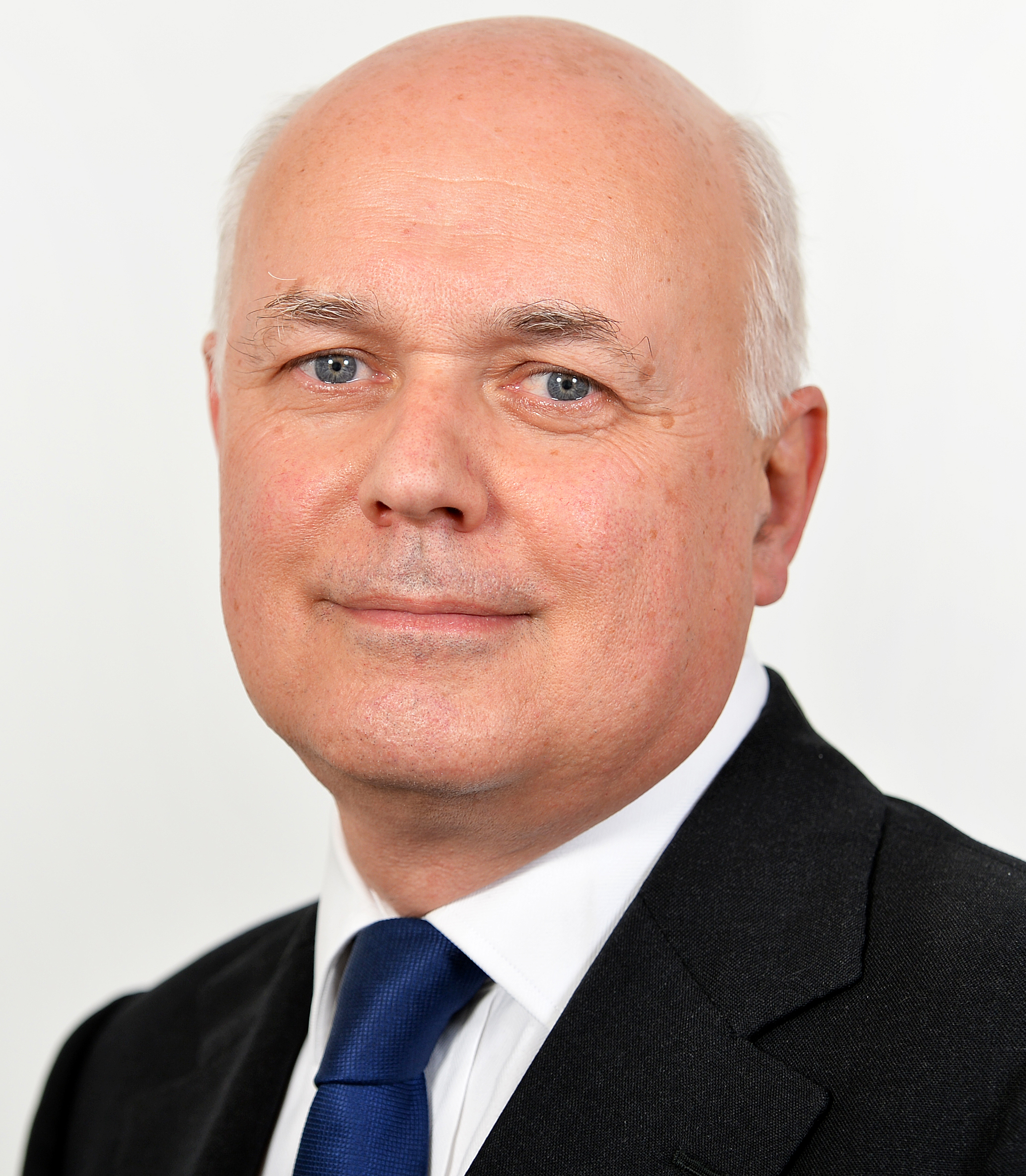
Iain Duncan Smith, then–Work and Pensions Secretary between 2010 and 2016 and one of the main architects of the Universal Credit system

Before Universal Credit was introduced, the UK welfare system consisted of around 40 distinct benefits and tax credits, with Department for Work and Pensions staff guidance reported to run over 8,000 pages.

The Universal Credit mechanism was itself first outlined as a concept in a 2009 report, Dynamic Benefits, authored by Iain Duncan Smith and Stephen Brien for the Centre for Social Justice think tank, which recommended consolidating multiple benefits into a single credit with a single rate for reducing benefits as earnings rise. It would go on to be described by the soon-to-be Work and Pensions Secretary at the Conservative Party annual conference in 2010. The initial aim was for it to be implemented fully over four years and two parliaments, and to merge the six main existing benefits (income-based Jobseeker's Allowance, income-related Employment and Support Allowance, Income Support, Working Tax Credit, Child Tax Credit and Housing Benefit) into a single monthly payment, as well as cut the considerable cost of administering six independent benefits, with their associated computer systems.

Unlike existing benefits like Income Support, which had a 100% withdrawal rate, Universal Credit was designed to gradually taper away – like tax credits and Housing Benefit – allowing claimants to take part-time work without losing their entitlement altogether. In theory, it makes claimants better off taking on work, as they keep at least a proportion of the money they earn. But reductions in funding and changes to withdrawal rates left commentators on either side of the debate to question whether it would actually make work pay. The Daily Telegraph claimed "part-time work may no longer pay", and "some people would be better off refusing" part-time work and in the Guardian Polly Toynbee wrote "Universal credit is simple: work more and get paid less". Finally, the "Minimum Income Floor" used when calculating Universal Credit for self-employed claimants may make it much less worthwhile for large parts of the population to work for themselves.

== Policy ==
The objectives of the policy included creating a more responsive system that would simplify and incentivise a return to work, pay benefits in a monthly cycle more akin to salaries, reduce the high marginal deduction rate that accumulates from the withdrawal of more than one means-tested benefit simultaneously to a single deduction rate improving incentives, ensure that taking on even a small or varying amount of work would be financially rewarding, and reduce the proportion of children growing up in homes where no one works. Universal Credit would merge out-of-work benefits and in-work support (specifically, Jobseeker's Allowance, Employment and Support Allowance, Income Support, Housing Benefit, Child Tax Credit, and Working Tax Credit, while Council Tax Benefit was excluded and devolved to local councils) to improve return to work incentives. Universal Credit’s reduction rate was originally set at 65% in 2010 and cut to 55% in November 2021.

The clearer financial incentives through Universal Credit would be strengthened by four types of conditionality for claimants depending on their circumstances, ranging from being required to look for full-time work to not being required to find work at all (people in the unconditional group include the severely disabled and carers). Universal Credit introduced in-work conditionality, which allows the Department for Work and Pensions to require low-paid workers to actively seek higher earnings or extra hours under threat of benefit sanctions.

Payments are made once a month directly into a bank or building society account, except in Scotland where claimants are given the option to have it paid fortnightly. Because payments are assessed in arrears, new claimants face an initial five-week wait for their first payment, during which repayable interest-free advances are available. Any help with rent granted as part of the overall benefit calculation is included in the monthly payment and claimants normally then pay landlords themselves. It is possible in some circumstances to get an Alternative Payment Arrangement (APA), which allows payment of housing benefit direct to the landlord.

Universal Credit claimants are also entitled to Personal Budgeting Support (PBS), which is aimed to help them adapt to some of the changes it brings, such as monthly payment, alongside the Department for Work and Pensions funded “Help to Claim” service run by Citizens Advice.

=== Major amendments ===
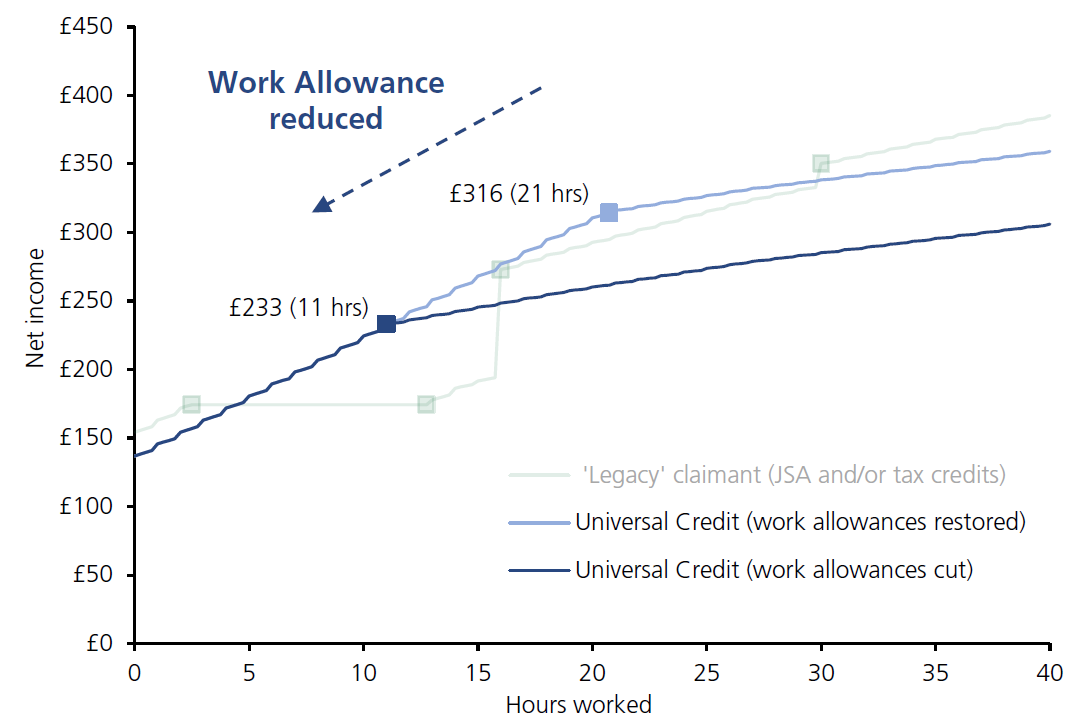
Post-2015 reductions projected weekly income of a lone parent with 1 child working on the National Living Wage in 2019 with Universal Credit (dark blue), compared to the previous Tax Credits system (light grey). The Universal Credit income planned prior to the 2015 reductions is also shown (light blue).

In 2015, the Chancellor, George Osborne, announced a future £3.2 billion a year cut to the overall Universal Credit budget after an attempt to cut Tax Credits that year was thwarted by parliament. The Resolution Foundation has argued that this cut, which will be felt more keenly as millions more people transfer to Universal Credit, risks the new system failing to achieve its original purpose of incentivising work in low-income households. The amendments were:

- Reductions in the amount of "work allowances" before tapered deductions due to income are applied, from April 2016
- Limiting the per-child element to only two children for new claims and births after April 2017
- Removing the extra element for the first child for new claims from April 2017

In November 2016, in response to criticism that the previous changes had reduced incentives to work, the government announced a reduction in the Universal Credit post-tax taper rate, which controls the reduction of Universal Credit as employment income grows, from 65% to 63% of post-tax income, which will ultimately cost £600 million per year.

In the 2018 budget, the Chancellor, Philip Hammond, announced an increase in the "work allowances" for households with children, and people with disabilities, with effect from April 2019, partially reversing the reductions announced in 2015. The post-tax work allowances will increase by £1,000 per year, representing an extra £630 of income for about 2.4 million households in employment, ultimately at a cost of about £1.7 billion per year. Extra transitional support for claimants being moved to Universal Credit was also announced.

In April 2020, as a one-year temporary response to the COVID-19 pandemic, the Universal Credit standard allowance was temporarily increased by £20 per week and housing benefit rent limits relaxed. The uplift was extended until 30 September 2021. Later analysis showed this lifted 400,000 children out of the government's relative poverty measure, reversing the increasing trend of previous years.

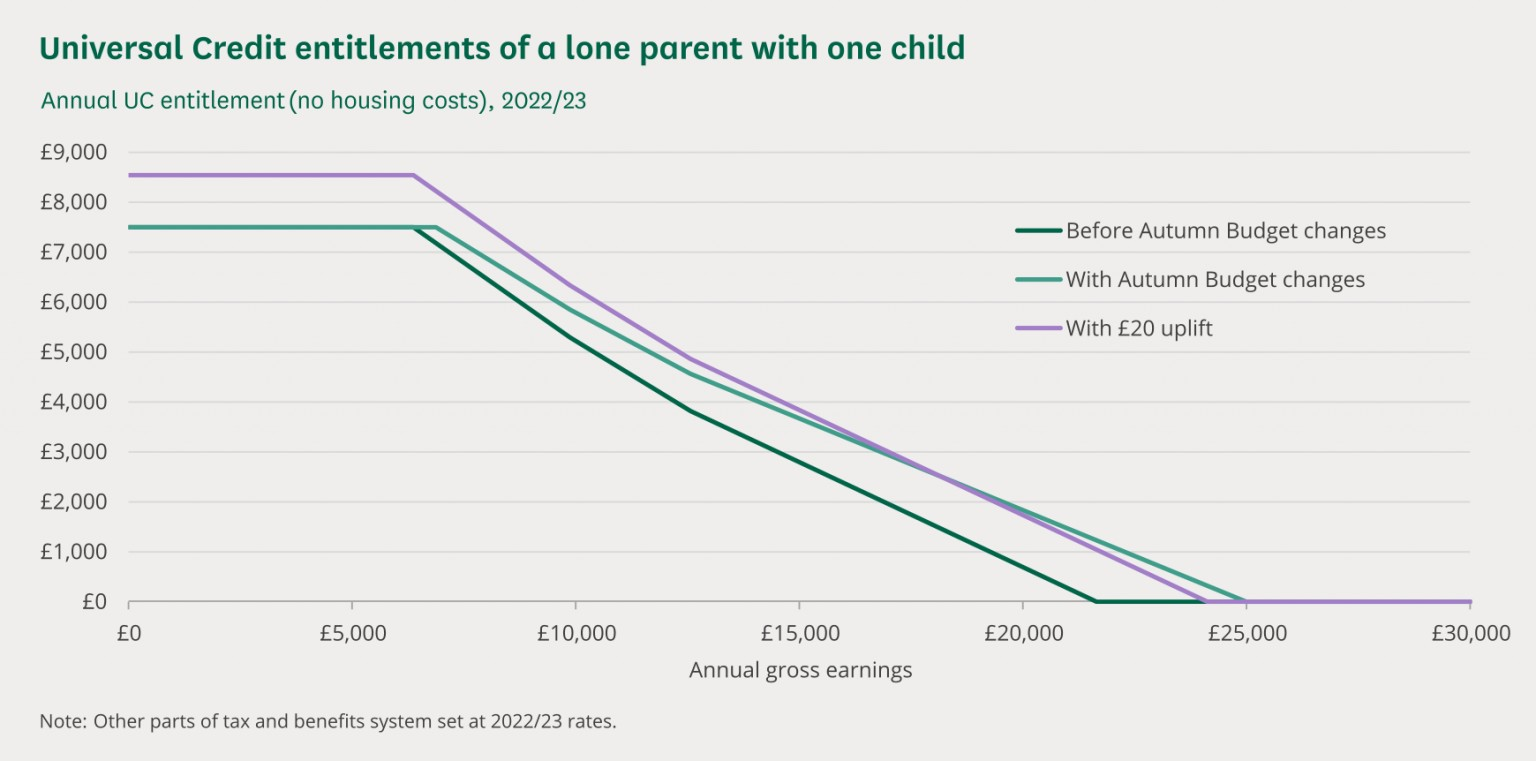
Effect of 2021 changes for a one child lone parent compared to the previous £20/week temporary uplift

The October 2021 budget increased in-work support by increasing the work allowances by £500 a year, and reducing the post-tax deduction taper rate from 63% to 55%. Iain Duncan Smith wrote that he was delighted that the taper rate would now be 55%, the level he wanted over a decade ago when he devised the scheme, but which had not been allowed by the Treasury. Analysis by the Resolution Foundation showed that three-quarters of families on UC would be worse off compared to the previous temporary £20 per week uplift during the Covid crisis.

=== Relationship to other proposed welfare policies ===
Universal Credit has some similarities to Lady Williams' idea of a negative income tax, but it should not be confused with the universal basic income policy idea. There is some debate as to whether Universal Credit should be described as "universal", given it is both subject to income cut-offs and requires some claimants to be available for work.

== Implementation ==
Universal Credit is part of a package of measures in the Welfare Reform Act 2012, which received Royal Assent on 9 March 2012. The Act delegates its detailed workings to regulations, most of which were published as the Universal Credit Regulations 2013. Related regulations appeared in a range of other statutory instruments also.

The Department for Work and Pensions (DWP) announced in February 2012 that Universal Credit would be delivered by selected best-performing DWP and Tax Credit processing centres. Initially, the announcement made clear that local authorities (responsible for administering payment of Housing Benefit, a legacy benefit to be incorporated into the scheme) would not have a significant part in delivering Universal Credit. However, the Government subsequently recognised there may be a useful role for local authorities to play when helping people access services within Universal Credit.

Philip Langsdale, chief information officer at DWP, who had been leading the programme, died in December 2012, and in previous months there had also been significant personnel changes. Project Director Hillary Reynolds resigned in March 2013 after just four months, leaving the new Chief Executive of Universal Credit to take on her role. Writing in 2013, Emma Norris of the Institute for Government argued the original timetable for implementation of Universal Credit was "hugely overambitious", with delays due to IT problems and senior civil servants responsible for the policy changing six times.

A staff survey, reported in The Guardian on 2 August 2013, quoted highly critical comments from Universal Credit implementation staff. On 31 October 2013, in another article said to be based on leaked documents, the paper reported that only 25,000 people – about 0.2% of all benefit recipients – were projected to transfer to the new programme by the time of the next general election in May 2015. In the event, over 100,000 people had made a claim for Universal Credit by May 2015.

A pilot in four local authority areas was due to precede national launch of the scheme for new claimants (excluding more complex cases such as families with children), in October 2013, with full implementation to be completed by 2017. Due to persistent computer system failures and delays in implementation, only one pilot, in Ashton-under-Lyne, went ahead by the expected date. The other three pilots went ahead later in the summer, and were met by staff protests.

The roll-out of Universal Credit in the Northwest of England was limited to new, single, healthy claimants, later extended to couples, then families, in the same area, reflecting the gradual maturing of different aspects of the computer system. Once the Northwest roll-out was largely complete, the government gradually extended Universal Credit to new single healthy claimants in the rest of the British mainland, nearly completing this roll-out as of 13 March 2016. It was expected that this would gradually be extended to couples and families outside the Northwest once the roll-out to UK mainland single claimants was completed. In Northern Ireland, implementation was held up by disputes over policy and funding between parties in the Northern Ireland Assembly; the roll-out of Universal Credit in Northern Ireland began in September 2017.

As of 2018 one third of claimants have their benefit reduced to pay rent, council tax and utility bill arrears. This pushed people who already have little further into poverty. Abby Jitendra of the Trussell Trust said this can lead to "the tipping point into crisis. [...] Repaying an advance payment, for example, can be an unaffordable expense when taken from a payment that wasn't enough to start with, pushing people further into debt at the time when support is most needed." Gillian Guy of Citizens Advice said, "Deductions from universal credit can make it harder for people to get by. People receiving universal credit are unlikely to have much slack in their budgets, so even small amounts can put a huge strain on their finances. Building on last year's improvements to universal credit, the government now needs to ensure deductions are made at a manageable rate and take a person's ability to cover their expenses into account." Charlotte Hughes who advises benefit recipients, said deductions were impossible to predict and often done with no warning. "The first time somebody knows that money's been taken out of their account is when they go to the bank. It's just a minefield. Living with that stress that you don't know what money you're going to get from week to week, from month to month, that makes you ill – and that's before you can't eat, and before you can't look after your kids properly. It's rampant."

According to National Audit Office figures, Universal Credit generated an estimated £349 million in operational efficiency savings in 2022-23, with the annualised cost to administer an individual claim falling from £593 in April 2018 to £195 in April 2023.

=== Pilots ===
The scheme was originally planned to begin in April 2013, in four local authorities – Tameside (containing Ashton-under-Lyne), Oldham, Wigan and Warrington, with payments being handled by the DWP Bolton Benefit Centre – but was later reduced to a single area (Ashton) with the others due to join in July. In Wales, the UC pilot covered new claimants in Brecon in early 2013. The pilot would initially cover only about 300 claims per month for the simplest cases of single people with no dependent children, and was to extend nationally for new claimants with the same circumstances by October, with a gradual transition to be complete by 2017. (One tester of the new system in April noted that the online forms took around 45 minutes to complete, and there was no save function.)

In March 2013 it was reported that final Universal Credit calculations would be made manually on spreadsheets during the pilot, with the IT system being limited to booking appointments and storing personal details. It was separately reported that no claimants turned up in person at the town hall on the first day of the scheme.

The Financial Times reported that the October national roll-out of Universal Credit would now begin in a single Jobcentre (or possibly a "cluster" of them) in each region and that in December 2012 Hilary Reynolds, who had recently been appointed programme director but had moved shortly thereafter, stated in a letter to local authorities: "For the majority of local authorities the impact of [Universal Credit] during the year 2013–14 will be limited."

On 3 December 2013, the DWP issued a report containing statistics which showed that, between April and 30 September, only 2,150 people had been signed up to Universal Credit in the four pilot areas. This report confirmed that Universal Credit had been rolled out to Hammersmith on 28 October, followed by Rugby and Inverness on 25 November, and was to expand to Harrogate, Bath, and Shotton by spring 2014.

=== Implementation costs ===
While the Department for Work and Pensions had estimated administration costs for the roll-out of Universal Credit to be £2.2 billion, by August 2014 this estimate had risen to £12.8 billion over its "lifetime" and was later increased again to £15.8 billion. Much of the increased cost was linked with software problems and duplication of systems needed to pay out new and legacy benefits. The initial roll-out proceeded much more slowly than had been originally planned, and led to the early departure of several senior leadership figures. In 2018 the National Audit Office maintained Universal Credit could incur higher administrative costs than the systems it replaces. A study by the Resolution Foundation published in November 2018 also predicted that Universal Credit will cost more than the older system of benefits it is replacing.

In 2020 a National Audit Office report identified £1.4 billion of extra costs up to March 2020 because of the recent two-year delay, which included the costs of continuing to run the legacy systems for longer. Per claim administration costs for 2019/2020 were about 10% higher than forecast, though the DWP continued to forecast that eventually administration costs would be 9% lower than the benefits it replaced, however the NAO assessed this was "still not certain". Fraud and error was estimated at 9.4% (£1.7 billion) of payments, higher than the 6.4% forecast.

In December 2023, the Department for Work and Pensions estimated the total cost of implementing Universal Credit at £2.928 billion. This represented a £912 million (45.2%) increase over the baseline £2.016 billion budget set in its 2018 business case. The National Audit Office attributed the cost growth mainly to inflation, timetable extensions, and new counter-fraud measures.

=== Current status ===
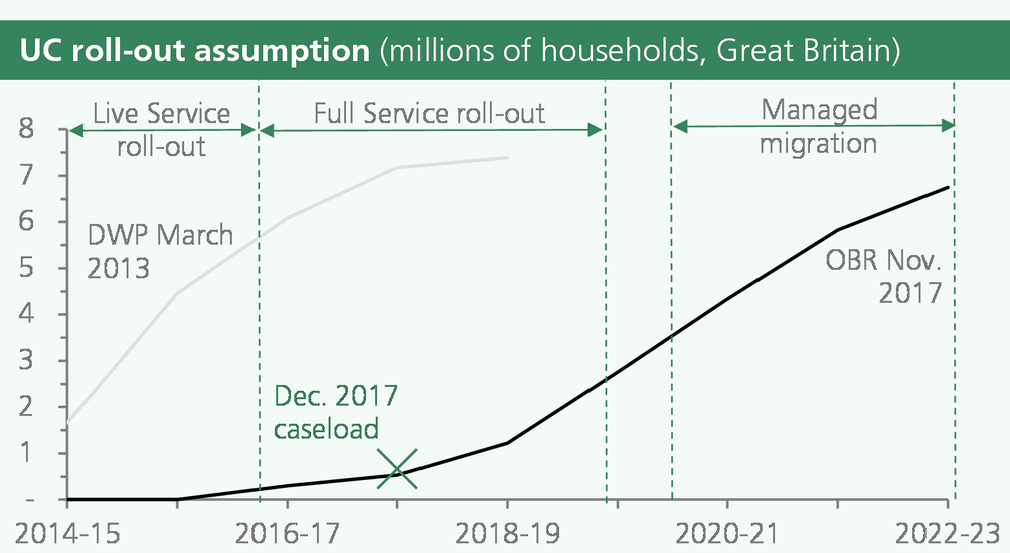
Anticipated roll-out progress as at November 2017 compared to the 2013 plan

In July 2018 the Secretary of State for Work and Pensions, Damian Green, announced a further 12-month delay to the planned implementation completion date to allow additional contingency time, taking that to 2022. This was the seventh rescheduling since 2013, pushing the implementation completion date to five years later than originally planned. In October 2018, the full rollout of Universal Credit will be delayed again to December 2023.

As of February 2016, 364,000 people had made claims for Universal Credit. Government research stated "Universal Credit claimants find work quicker, stay in work longer and earn more than the Jobseekers' Allowance claimants." Delays in payments were getting claimants into rent arrears and other debts, however. Claimants may wait up to thirteen weeks for their first payment. Tenants can get into rent arrears more frequently on Universal Credit rather than Housing Benefit and many risk eviction and homelessness as a result. Landlords may refuse potential tenants on the benefit and marriages have broken up under the strain of coping with these delays and managing on Universal Credit.

In 2018, Frank Field, MP and charities stated women have been forced into prostitution because they could not manage during times when Universal Credit payments were delayed. Field stated, "If I told people a few years ago that this was happening they would have thought I was off my rocker. I'm still struggling to comprehend it. Women often come to us in tears, they say the benefits system has got worse and they have very little choice." Fields also said, "I wrote to the secretary of state about how the rollout of universal credit in Birkenhead is not going as well as we’re told in the House of Commons, with some women taking to the red light district for the first time. Might she [Esther McVey] come to Birkenhead and meet those women's organisations and the police who are worried about women's security being pushed into this position?" In 2019 the Work and Pensions Committee of the House of Commons heard evidence from women claiming they had been forced into prostitution through delays in paying Universal Credit or because Universal Credit payments were insufficient to meet their basic needs. The committee recommended ending the five-week wait for a first payment and, giving vulnerable claimants advances that did not need to be repaid if they would otherwise experience hardship.

In April 2018 The Trussell Trust reported that their food banks in areas where universal credit had been rolled out had seen an average 52% rise in demand compared to the previous year. The Trussell Trust fears a big increase in food bank use when Universal Credit is rolled out in April 2019. Emma Revie of Trussell said, "We’re really worried that our network of food banks could see a big increase in people needing help. Leaving 3 million people to wait at least five weeks for a first payment – especially when we have already decided they need support through our old benefits or tax credits system – is just not good enough. Now is the time for our government to take responsibility for moving people currently on the old system over, and to ensure no one faces a gap in payments when that move happens. Universal credit needs to be ready for anyone who might need its help, and it needs to be ready before the next stage begins."

Despite May's promise to support those "just about managing", working homeowners who currently get tax credits lose badly with universal credit. A million homeowners now getting tax credits will have less with the new system and lose on average £43 a week. 600,000 working single parents will lose on average £16 per week and roughly 750,000 households on disability benefits will lose on average £75 per week. Nearly 2 in 5 households receiving benefits will be on average worse off by £52 per week. Up to thirty Conservative MP's are threatening to vote against the government over Universal Credit. Heidi Allen said, "Significant numbers of colleagues on my side of the House are saying this isn't right and are coming together to say the chancellor needs to look at this again." The Resolution Foundation predicts that 400,000 single parents will be better off under universal credit but 600,000 will do worse. The foundation fears lone parents could be trapped in low-paid work with short hours.

In January 2019, Amber Rudd, the Work and Pensions Secretary, suspended a planned vote on moving the three million established recipients of older benefits onto Universal Credit. Rudd said that the government would seek approval for the previously announced pilot study of 10,000 such people, who will not see their benefits stopped in the summer of 2019 but have the opportunity to apply for Universal Credit. Rudd also announced that plans to retrospectively extend a benefit cap to families of more than two children born before 2017 would no longer take place. On the same day, the High Court ruled that her department had "wrongly interpreted" regulations covering the calculation of Universal Credit payments in cases where working claimants' paydays fluctuated.

In February 2020, the government announced that the rollout of Universal Credit would be delayed again until September 2024 – nine months later than previously estimated. The Department for Work and Pensions explained that the delay was due to 900,000 more claimants than expected remaining on the legacy welfare schemes that Universal Credit is replacing. The delay is estimated to add more than £500 million to its overall cost.

=== Support ===
Support for claimants was initially delivered by local authorities. In October 2018, the Department for Work and Pensions announced that from April 2019, Citizens Advice and Citizens Advice Scotland would be provided with £39 million of funding and £12 million in set up costs to deliver Universal Support. In April 2019, this was rebranded as the "Help to Claim" service and helpline, delivered by Citizens Advice and Citizens Advice Scotland.

=== Unemployment claimant count ===
Before 2013, the unemployment claimant count was simply the number of people claiming Jobseeker's Allowance. However, Universal Credit implementation has gradually broadened the groups of people who are required to look for work. For example, those that had previously claimed Child Tax Credit or Housing Benefit but not Jobseeker's Allowance, such as a person looking after children full time at home with a working partner, were not required to seek work. Under Universal Credit, the partners of claimants are now generally required to seek work.

Between November 2015 and November 2019, the number of claimants increased by over 70% (420,000), largely due to such causes. In many areas the claimant count had more than doubled, and in some more than quadrupled. Consequently, in 2018 the UK Statistics Authority removed its quality mark from claimant count statistics as it no longer provided a reliable comparator against previous labour market statistics.

In 2019 the DWP published an alternative claimant count series, which used modelling to estimate the number of claimants had Universal Credit been fully implemented in 2013, for use in statistical labour market comparison. A Department for Work and Pensions evaluation, reported by the National Audit Office in 2024, found that single new Universal Credit claimants were 2 percentage points more likely to enter employment within 6 months compared to Jobseeker's Allowance claimants. For single parents, new Universal Credit claimants were 5 percentage points more likely to enter work within 6 months.

=== Changing monthly pay day ===
When claimants are paid salary a few days early by employers, for example because of weekends or bank holidays, this can result in two monthly payments in one assessment period and zero in the next. This results in both very uneven Universal Credit payments and lower payments over the complete year because of the cancellation of work allowance for entire months, causing hardship and stress for claimants and additional costs for food banks and other support organisations. Four single mothers, with assistance from the Child Poverty Action Group, took this issue for judicial review at the High Court, which in 2019 ruled the DWP had made a "perverse" and incorrect interpretation of the 2013 universal credit regulations. The DWP had argued it would be expensive to change their computer system to fix this problem.

In June 2020 the DWP lost an appeal, where it was ruled that this was "one of the rare instances where the secretary of state for work and pensions’ refusal to put in place a solution to this very specific problem is so irrational that I have concluded that the threshold is met because no reasonable [minister] would have struck the balance in that way". The DWP decided not to appeal further and to modify their systems to comply with the ruling.

In July 2020 the DWP lost a further case where the claimant was being paid on a 4-week cycle which interacted badly with the monthly cycle Universal Credit was designed for, causing her to lose up to £463 some months through the incorrect application of the benefit cap.

== Criticism ==
Universal Credit has been and is subject to many criticisms. Louise Casey fears recipients could become homeless and destitute. According to official figures 24% of new claimants wait over 6 weeks for full payment and many get behind with their rent. Research by Southwark Council suggests that rent arrears continue when tenants have been on Universal Credit a long time.

A DWP report, released in February 2022, (after months of delays and Conservative government attempts to dilute findings) admitted "major unmet needs" amongst disabled claimants.

Disabled claimants are often forced to use Personal Independence Payment (theoretically for mitigating costs of disability and available to both in and out of work disabled people) to cover cost of daily life as Income Replacement benefits are generally inadequate.

Twelve Tory MPs including Heidi Allen wished the rollout delayed. Local Authorities and recipients of Universal Credit feared claimants will become homeless in large numbers. Gordon Brown maintains, "Surely the greatest burning injustice of all is children having to go to school ill-clad and hungry. It is the poverty of the innocent – of children too young to know they are not to blame. But the Conservative government lit the torch of this burning injustice and they continue to fan the flames with their £3bn of cuts. A return to poll tax-style chaos in a summer of discontent lies ahead."

Stephen Bush in The New Statesman maintained that the group currently (October 2017) in receipt of Universal Credit was unrepresentative, consisting mainly of men under 30 who were more likely to find work as they did not have to juggle work obligations with dependent needs. He also argued that men under 30 were also more likely to be living with parents so delays in payments affected them less. Bush believed that when Universal Credit is extended to older claimants and women with dependents, fewer would get back to work easily and there would be more hardship.

Johnny Mercer said, "Universal credit has the potential to help people out of poverty by removing the disincentives to move into work in the previous system and allowing them to reach their full potential. A modern compassionate Conservative government simply must get it right though. This government can make the system better by smoothing the path from welfare into work with a fresh investment in universal credit in this budget." Mercer backed calls to increase funding for Universal Credit by stopping a plan to cut income tax. Some claimants on Universal Credit feel they cannot get enough to live without resorting to crime. One in five claims for Universal Credit fails because the claimant does not follow the procedure correctly and there are fears this is because the procedure is hard to understand.

Food bank use has increased since Universal Credit started. Delays in providing money force claimants to use food banks, also Universal Credit does not provide enough to cover basic living expenses. Claiming Universal Credit is complex and the system is hard to navigate, many claimants cannot afford internet access and cannot access online help with claiming. A report by The Trussell Trust says, "Rather than acting as a service to ensure people do not face destitution, the evidence suggests that for people on the very lowest incomes ... the poor functioning of universal credit can actually push people into a tide of bills, debts and, ultimately, lead them to a food bank. People are falling through the cracks in a system not made to hold them. What little support available is primarily offered by the third sector, whose work is laudable, but cannot be a substitute for a real, nationwide safety net."

The National Audit Office maintains there is no evidence Universal Credit helps people into work and it is unlikely to provide value for money, the system is in many ways unwieldy and inefficient. There are calls for delays and for the system to be fixed before it is rolled out to millions of further claimants. Margaret Greenwood said, "The government is accelerating the rollout in the face of all of the evidence, using human beings as guinea pigs. It must fix the fundamental flaws in universal credit and make sure that vulnerable people are not pushed into poverty because of its policies."

Whistleblowers maintain the system is badly designed, broken and glitches regularly lead to hardship for claimants. Hardship can involve delays in benefit payment lasting weeks or reduction in payment by hundreds of pounds below what a claimant is entitled to. A whistleblower said, "The IT system on which universal credit is built is so fundamentally broken and poorly designed that it guarantees severe problems with claims." He maintained the system is too complex and error prone, affecting payments, and correction was frequently slow. "In practical terms, it is not working the way it was intended and it is having an actively harmful effect on a huge number of claimants." Errors and delays add an average of three weeks to the official 35 day wait for a first payment forcing claimants into debt, rent arrears and to food banks. Campaigners fear the situation could worsen in 2019 when 3 million claimants are moved to the new system. The Department for Work and Pensions is accused of being defensive and insular. One whistleblower said design problems existed due to failure to understand what claimants need, particularly when they do not have digital skills or internet access. He said, "We are punishing claimants for not understanding a system that is not built with them in mind."

In October 2018, former Prime Minister Sir John Major warned against Universal Credit being introduced "too soon and in the wrong circumstances". Major argued that people who faced losing out in the short term had to be protected, "or you run into the sort of problems the Conservative Party ran into with the poll tax in the late 1980s".

A report by Bright Blue, funded by Trust for London, recommended that several changes be made to the Universal Credit system. These changes included introducing a Universal Credit app, offering all new Universal Claimants a one off "helping hand" payment to avoid the five week waiting period and entering claimants who consistently meet conditions around job seeking into a monthly lottery.

=== Reducing incomes ===
Multiple organisations have predicted that Universal Credits will cause families with children to be financially worse off. When fully operational, the Institute for Fiscal Studies estimates that 2.1 million families will lose while 1.8 million will gain. Single parents and families with three children will lose an average £200 a month according to the Child Poverty Action Group and the Institute for Public Policy Research. Alison Garnham of the CPAG urged ministers to reverse cuts to work allowances and get Universal Credit, "fit for families". Garnham said: "Universal credit was meant to improve incentives for taking a job while helping working families get better off. But cuts have shredded it. And families with kids will see the biggest income drops." Since 2013 Universal Credit has changed nine times, most changes making it less generous. This includes cuts in work allowances, a freeze in credit rates for four years and (from April 2017) the child credit being limited to two per family.

In October 2017, the Resolution Foundation estimated that compared to the existing tax credit system: 2.2 million working families would be better off under the Universal Credit system, with an average increase in income of £41 a week. On the other hand, the Foundation estimated that 3.2 million working families would be worse off, with an average loss of £48 a week.

In October 2018, the Work and Pensions Secretary, Esther McVey MP, admitted that "some people could be worse off on this benefit", but argued that the most vulnerable would be protected.

In January 2020, a report by the Resolution Foundation found that Universal Credit creates "a complex mix of winners and losers". It found that in Liverpool, just 32% of families will be better off under Universal Credit, while 52% will be worse off, compared to a national average of 46% losing out, and 39% gaining.

A 2020 study compared Universal Credit to its predecessor schemes. Recipients of all quintiles from poor to rich were found to earn less under UC. Further, the study found it more regressive than its predecessor scheme. This means it reduces the income of poorer claimants by a greater percentage than richer claimants. However, it becomes less regressive in the long-run. UC reduces entitlements to those with assets, homeowners, and the self-employed, who, it finds, are more likely to be temporarily poor rather than persistently. So since UC is relatively more generous to the persistently poor, it becomes less regressive (but still regressive) in the long-run.

=== Deductions ===
Over 60% of claimants experience deductions, many to repay loans they got to tide them over the first five weeks before they officially got payments. Gillian Guy of Citizens Advice said, "Our evidence shows many people on universal credit are struggling to make ends meet, and that deductions are contributing to this." She urged the government to start affordability tests before recovering debts from claimants. Neil Couling, the chief of the universal credit programme, "admitted that the government over the last 18 months has demanded a push to recover old debt and has provided UC with extra funds to do this". The recovery of debts causes hardship, often due to loans given during the initial five-week wait period but with some larger debts from over-payments made in the previous tax credits system when income increased rapidly.

In 2022, the High Court ruled that deducting up to 25% of a claim without the claimant's consent to pay directly to utility companies at their request was unlawful and breaches an "obligation of fairness". In 2025, the High Court similarly ruled paying social landlords directly without taking representations from the claimant, such as the money was withheld in dispute over repairs, was unfair and unlawful.

=== Self-employed claimants ===
Research by the Low Income Tax Reform Group suggests self-employed claimants could be over £2,000 year worse off than employed claimants on similar incomes. The problem applies with fluctuating income as Universal Credit assumes a fixed number of hours worked – the so-called Minimum Income Floor – in its calculation. The government has been urged to change this to allow the self-employed to base claims on their average incomes. Some claimants even could be over £4,000 a year worse off. Some people cannot find work except by being self-employed and such people will be discouraged from starting a business. Frank Field asks, "how many grafters and entrepreneurs are going to be further impoverished, or pushed deeper into debt, as a result of this new hole being opened up in the safety net."

Citizens Advice maintains that it risks "creating or exacerbating financial insecurity for the rising sector of the workforce in non-traditional work". People working in their own business will be affected as will those with seasonal work like agriculture and the hotel trade and those with varying overtime pay. 4.5 million people do work with varying hours while 4.8 million are self-employed most receiving in work benefits.

=== Online applications ===
Professor John Seddon, an author and occupational psychologist, began a campaign in January 2011 for an alternative way to deliver Universal Credit, arguing it was impossible to deliver high-variety services through "cheaper" transaction channels, and would drive costs up. He wrote an open letter to Iain Duncan Smith and Lord Freud as part of a campaign to call halt to current plans and embark instead on a "systems approach". Seddon also launched a petition calling for Duncan Smith to: "rethink the centralised, IT-dominated service design for the delivery of Universal Credit". Professor Phillip Alston (the United Nations Special Rapporteur on extreme poverty and human rights) visited the UK in 2018 to report on the impact that the austerity measures implemented since 2010 had had on the disabled and reported that the universal credit digital system had been designed to be difficult. His report has prompted academics to call for complementary non-digital services.

Echoing these concerns, Ronnie Campbell, MP for Blyth Valley, sponsored an Early Day Motion on 13 June 2011 on the delivery of Universal Credit which was signed by thirty MPs: "That this House notes that since only fifteen per cent of people in deprived areas have used a Government website in the last year, the Department for Work and Pensions (DWP) may find that more Universal Credit customers than expected will turn to face-to-face and telephone help from their local authority, DWP helplines, Government-funded welfare organisations, councillors and their Hon. Member as they find that the automated system is not able to deal with their individual questions, particular concerns and unique set of circumstances".

=== Wait for payments and payment frequency ===
Universal Credit is calculated on a monthly assessment cycle and paid in arrears, establishing a standard five-week wait between an initial application and the first benefit disbursement. During earlier implementation phases, administrative delays resulted in extended waiting times, with up to 40% of new claimants in 2017 waiting 11 weeks or longer for their initial payment. To cover living expenses during this initial period, the Department for Work and Pensions provided interest-free Universal Credit Advances, which are recovered through automatic benefit deductions over up to 24 months. Unlike legacy benefits that were typically paid weekly or fortnightly, Universal Credit consolidated payments into a single monthly sum paid directly to the claimant, including housing support.

Evidence submitted to Parliament, audit reviews, and academic studies indicate that monthly payment cycles and initial waiting times created severe budgeting challenges, driving increases in rent arrears, personal debt, and food bank reliance. To lessen financial hardship, Jobcentre Plus work coaches can issue Alternative Payment Arrangements (APAs) that allow housing costs to be paid directly to landlords or split disbursements into fortnightly payments.

The Trades Union Congress has raised concerns about the delay – which is at least six weeks – between making a claim and receiving money. The Work and Pensions Select Committee (WPSC) said waiting six-weeks for the first payment caused "acute financial difficulty". Reducing the delay would make the policy more likely to succeed. Some claimants must wait eight months for their first payment. About 20% waited nearly five months and roughly 8% had to wait for eight months. Committee Chair Frank Field said, "Such a long wait bears no relation to anyone's working life and the terrible hardship it has been proven to cause actually makes it more difficult for people to find work. "

According to a report in The Guardian, thousands of claimants get into debt, get behind with their rent and risk eviction due to flaws in Universal Credit. Landlords and politicians want the system overhauled.

Due to ongoing problems an official inquiry has been launched into Universal Credit. In October 2017, Prime Minister Theresa May said the six-week delay would continue, despite the concerns of many MPs including some in her own party. A study for Southwark and Croydon councils found substantial increase in indebtedness and rent arrears among claimants on Universal Credit compared with claimants on the old system. Referrals to food banks increased, in one case by 97 per cent.

End Hunger UK, a coalition of poverty charities and faith organizations said payment delays, administrative mistakes and failure to support claimants having difficulties with the online only system forced up food bank use. End Hunger UK urged ministers to do a systematic study of how universal credit affects claimants’ financial security. End Hunger UK urged a large cut in the time claimants wait for their first payment from at least five weeks to only two weeks, and maintain the long wait is financially crippling for claimants without savings. The Trussell Trust found demand for food aid rose an average of a 52% in universal credit areas in 2017, contrasted with 13% in areas where it had not been introduced. "It is simply wrong that so many families are forced to use food banks and are getting into serious debt because of the ongoing failings in the benefits system," said Paul Butler, Bishop of Durham.

Claimants with children who start work must pay child care early and wait for Universal Credit to repay them later, the WPSC reported. The WPSC maintains this is a, "barrier to work". According to the report, "Universal Credit claimants must pay for childcare up front and claim reimbursement from the department after the childcare has been provided. This can leave households waiting weeks or even months to be paid back. Many of those households will be in precarious financial positions which Universal Credit could exacerbate: if, for example, they have fallen into debt or rent arrears while awaiting Universal Credit payments. Too many will face a stark choice: turn down a job offer, or get themselves into debt in order to pay for childcare." The WPSC maintains ministers should pay universal credit childcare costs directly to childcare providers. This would take the burden away from parents and give providers a more certain incomes. Frank Field said, "It's not just driving parents into despair and debt and creating problems for childcare providers – it's also actively working to prevent the government achieving its own aim of getting more people into work."

The High Court ruled in January 2019 that the DWP "wrongly interpreted" regulations covering the calculation of Universal Credit payments in cases where working claimants' paydays fluctuated. The DWP's interpretation had meant receiving a salary a few days early because of a weekend or bank holiday "vastly reduced" one's universal credit payment, a situation the judges described as "odd in the extreme" that "could be said to lead to nonsensical situations". The DWP had defended this anomaly by saying that changing its automated system would be expensive. The Child Poverty Action Group said the anomaly had caused "untold hardship, stress and misery" and forced one of the working single mothers in the case to rely on food banks, despite requiring fresh fruit and vegetables due to pregnancy.

In February 2019, the Secretary of State for Work and Pensions, Amber Rudd, conceded that "there were challenges with the initial roll-out of universal credit. The main issue which led to an increase in food bank use could have been the fact that people had difficulty accessing their money early enough". Rudd went on to explain that "We have made changes to accessing universal credit so that people can have advances, so that there is a legacy run-on after two weeks of housing benefit, and we believe that will help with food and security".

=== Direct payments to tenants ===
Direct payment of the housing component of Universal Credit (formerly Housing Benefit) to tenants has been the subject of controversy. Although Housing Benefit has long been paid to most private sector tenants directly, for social housing tenants it has historically been paid directly to their landlords. As a result, implementation of a social housing equivalent to the Local Housing Allowance policy, which has been present in the private sector without comment for over a decade, has widely been perceived as a tax on having extra bedrooms, rather than the tenant making up a shortfall in the rent arising from a standardisation of their level of benefit.

The Social Security Advisory Committee have argued that the policy of direct payments requires "close monitoring" so as to make sure Universal Credit does not further discourage landlords from renting to people on benefits.

=== Disincentive to save ===
The Institute for Fiscal Studies has argued that Universal Credit is a disincentive for people to save money, as when liquid savings exceed £6,000 the Universal Credit award is reduced until savings fall below £6,000.

=== Impact on the self-employed ===
The Resolution Foundation has warned that Universal Credit will have a detrimental effect on self-employed people, because the level of Universal Credit awarded does not fully take account of any dramatic changes in their income from month to month.

According to the Child Poverty Action Group, Universal Credit may affect the low-paid self-employed and anyone who makes a tax loss (spends more on tax-deductible expenses than they receive in taxable income) in a given tax year.

=== Impact on disabled people ===
Citizens Advice research argued that 450,000 disabled people and their families would be worse off under universal credit. The Work and Pensions Select Committee found Universal Credit's system of sanctions to be "pointlessly cruel", and asked for Universal Credit to be put on hold till it is clear that very vulnerable disabled claimants are protected from serious income loss. Single disabled people in employment were found to be £300 per month worse off when moved on to Universal Credit. Claimants risk being isolated, destitute and in some cases forced to rely on dependent children for care, according to the committee.

=== Impact on passported benefits ===
The Daily Mirror reported an example of a claimant who was moved over to Universal Credit from a "legacy benefit" and whose passported benefits, such as free school meals, were withdrawn in error.

=== Domestic abuse ===
Universal Credit payments go to one person in each household, so abuse victims and their children are often left dependent according to a Work and Pensions Committee report and abusers can exert financial control. It is feared this can facilitate abuse and enable bullying. Financial abuse is also facilitated, one abuse survivor said to the committee that "[the abusive partner] will wake up one morning with £1,500 in his account and piss off with it, leaving us with nothing for weeks." Committee chair, Frank Field said, "This is not the 1950s. Men and women work independently, pay taxes as individuals, and should each have an independent income. Not only does UC's single household payment bear no relation to the world of work, it is out of step with modern life and turns back the clock on decades of hard-won equality for women." MPs listened to evidence that abuse victims found the whole of their income, including money intended for the children, went into the abuser's bank account. The report noted the single household payment caused difficulties for victims wanting to leave and said, "there is a serious risk of Universal Credit increasing the powers of abusers". The report called for all Job Centres to have a private room where people at risk of abuse could state their concerns confidentially. There should also be a domestic abuse specialist in each Job Centre who could alert other staff to signs of abuse. Scotland wants to split payments by default but needs the DWP to change the IT system. The report wants the department to work with Scotland and test a new split payment system. Katie Ghose of Women's Aid called on the government to implement the report and stated, "It is clear from this report that there are major concerns about the safety of Universal Credit in cases where there is domestic abuse."

The campaign group Women's Aid have argued that as Universal Credit benefits are paid as a single payment to the household, this has negative consequences for victims of domestic abuse. The Guardian also argued the change disempowers women, preventing them from being financially independent. Women's Aid and the TUC jointly did research showing 52 per cent of victims living with their abuser claimed financial abuse prevented them from leaving. Under Universal Credit when a couple separates, one person must inform the DWP, and make a fresh claim, which takes at least five weeks to process. Someone without money, and possibly with children cannot manage such a wait. Katie Ghose said, "We're really concerned that the implications for women for whom financial abuse is an issue have not been fully thought through or appreciated by the government." Jess Phillips stated, "What we are doing is essentially eliminating the tiny bit of financial independence that at woman might have had." And, she added, the DWP keeps no data on whether Universal Credit goes to men or to women, therefore the magnitude of the problem cannot be measured.

=== Impact on families ===
In the report Pop Goes the Payslip the advice organisation Citizens Advice highlighted examples of people in work worse off under Universal Credit than under the 'legacy' benefits it replaces. Similarly, a report from 2012 by Save the Children highlights how "a single parent with two children, working full-time on or around the minimum wage, could be as much as £2,500 a year worse".

Gingerbread has also highlighted their concerns over Universal Credit's disproportional impact on single parent families in particular. As of August 2018, 25% of all recipients were lone parents, with 90% of all single parent families eligible for Universal Credit when the benefit is fully rolled out. Single parents make up the overwhelming majority of claimants affected by the Benefit Cap under Universal Credit: 73% of capped households are headed by single parents, while 75% of those have a child under five - a fact which greatly impacts their ability to find suitable work.

=== Work deterrents ===
A House of Commons Library briefing note raised the concern that changes to Universal Credit that were scheduled to take effect in April 2016 might make people reluctant to take more hours at work:

There is concern that families transferring to Universal Credit as part of the managed migration whose entitlement to UC is substantially lower than their existing benefits and tax credits might be reluctant to move into work or increase their hours if this would trigger a loss of transitional protection, thereby undermining the UC incentives structure.

The very long application and assessment hiatus also discourages UC recipients from moving off Universal Credit entirely, for more than six months, fearful having to undergo repeated and very long waiting periods, with no income, resulting because of redundancy and/or loss of temporary employment for legitimate reasons necessitating reapplication for Universal Credit from scratch.

In 2015, the Chancellor announced a future £3.2 billion a year cut to the Universal Credit budget after an attempt to cut Tax Credits that year was thwarted by parliament. The Resolution Foundation has argued that this cut risks the new system failing to achieve its original purpose of incentivising work in low-income households. The 2015 cut was partly reversed in the 2018 budget by a promised uplift of £1.7 billion per year to the money available to encourage recipients to increase their hours at work.

=== Internal criticisms ===
A freedom of information request was made by Tony Collins and John Slater in 2012. They sought the publication of documents detailing envisioned problems, problems that arose with implementation, and a high-level review.

In March 2016, a third judicial case ordered the DWP to release the documents. The government's argument against releasing the documents was the possibility of a chilling effect for the DWP and other government departments.

=== IT problems ===
Universal Credit has been dogged by IT problems. A DWP whistleblower told Channel 4's Dispatches in 2014 that the computer system was "completely unworkable", "badly designed" and "out of date". A 2015 survey of Universal Credit staff found that 90% considered the IT system inadequate.

=== Telephone problems ===
Claimants on low income were forced to pay for long telephone calls. Citizens Advice in England carried out a survey in summer 2017 which found an average waiting time of 39 minutes with claimants often needing to make repeated calls. Nearly a third of respondents said they made over 10 calls. The government was urged to make telephone calls over Universal Credit free for claimants which was done in 2019.

=== ID requirements ===
In December 2018, Liverpool Walton MP Dan Carden wrote to Secretary of State for Work and Pensions, Amber Rudd, to raise concerns after a number of people claiming Universal Credit were told to apply for provisional driving licences as a form of ID, with the costs being taken from their benefits. In response to the letter a DWP spokesperson said that "having ID is not a requirement for those making a Universal Credit claim", though this appeared to contradict the guidance on the government's website.

=== Fraud ===
It was originally hoped that Universal Credit would help to save about £1bn in fraud and error. However, in July 2019 it was revealed that an estimated £20 million of public money had been stolen by fraudsters. Criminals were found to be exploiting a loophole in the online system to fraudulently apply for universal credit and claiming advance loans on behalf of other people who were unaware that they had been signed up for the benefit. One jobcentre reported that £100,000 of fraudulent activity had been recorded each month. It was estimated that 42,000 people may have fallen victim to the scam.

Following the revelations, the Work and Pensions minister Justin Tomlinson announced that "where it is clear that they have been a victim of fraud through no fault of their own, no, we would not expect them to pay it back." A spokesperson from the Department for Work and Pensions later explained that victims of the scam would have to repay any money that they had kept.

=== Mental health ===
A study by The Lancet Public Health Journal released in February 2020 linked a sharp increase in mental-health problems among the unemployed with the rollout of Universal Credit and other government welfare changes. It found that the number of unemployed people with psychological distress rose by 6.6% from 2013 to 2018. It also found a third of unemployed recipients of Universal Credit were likely to have become clinically depressed.

Economic evaluations indicate that transitioning to unemployment under Universal Credit causes a greater decline in mental health than under the legacy welfare system. Research published in the Journal of Health Economics found that single adults and lone parents who became unemployed under Universal Credit experienced a mental health deterioration of 8.4% and 13.9% of a standard deviation, respectively, with negative impacts persisting into subsequent years. Mediation analysis attributed this decline to reduced household income, increased difficulty paying bills, lower leisure satisfaction resulting from 30-hour weekly job search requirements, and higher rates of claimants exiting the welfare system altogether.

=== Crime ===
Econometric studies examining the roll-out of Universal Credit across parliamentary constituencies in England and Wales found a statistically significant link between the reform and an increase in property crime. Research by Rocco d'Este and Alex Harvey estimated that the policy caused a 2.5% to 3.4% monthly rise in acquisitive offenses, leading to between 35,000 and 45,000 additional burglaries and more than 25,000 vehicle crimes. Researchers calculated that these additional offenses resulted in an estimated societal cost ranging from £270 million to £465 million.

== See also ==
- Welfare Reform Act 2012
- Welfare Reform and Work Act 2016
