= Witness Service =

Government program

The Witness Service is a service in England and Wales for witnesses who have to give evidence in criminal courts. The Witness Service offers practical and emotional support and is a free service. The service is funded by the UK government's Ministry of Justice, which also publishes general advice about testifying in court

== History ==
The Witness Service was first set up by Victim Support in the 1990s after research by the charity showed witnesses needed help to testify in court. It lobbied the government to fund the service, winning funding from the Home Office in 1991 and launching the service in 1994. By 1996 there was a witness service in every Crown Court in England and Wales.

Victim Support successfully ran the service for around twenty years before the Ministry of Justice awarded the £24m fixed-term contract to run the service to Citizens Advice in 2014. At the time, the Law Society Gazette reported that Citizens Advice Service did not get any additional funding to run the service.

The NSPCC set up and ran a specialist service specifically for child witnesses, which Victim Support developed further in a pilot study with funding from the Ministry of Justice.

Victim Support has since been re-awarded the contract to run the service from April 2026.
