= Citizens Advice International =

International advice organisation

- Abbreviation: CAI
- Founded: 2004; 22 years ago
- Established: 2004; 22 years ago
- Type: Non-governmental organization
- Legal status: Non-profit
- Headquarters: Brussels, Belgium
- Region served: Worldwide
- Services: Promoting free, impartial, and confidential advice and information services
- Affiliations: European Citizen Action Service
- Website: www.cai-international.org

Citizens Advice International (CAI) is an organisation registered in Belgium that was established in 2004. It is an umbrella organisation that represents advice organisations throughout the world. It works at a European level with the European Citizen Action Service. Citizens Advice International aims to promote free advice services and provide support to Citizens Advice organisations throughout the world. Citizens Advice International is not controlled by the British Citizens Advice charity.
