= Betterton Report on Public Assistance =

The Betterton Report on Public Assistance was a 1924 report on the British system of public assistance. It recommended that advice centres be set up and was one factor behind the establishment of the Citizens Advice organisation in the United Kingdom.
