= Gillian Guy =

Dame Gillian Guy, DBE is a British administrator who is currently the Independent Assessor of the Financial Ombudsman Service. She was previously chief executive officer of Citizens Advice, a network of charitable organisations employing 7,000. She joined in 2010 from the charity Victim Support. She was also a non-practitioner member of the Banking Standards Board.

== Career ==
Guy has been Chief Executive Officer of three organisations, as well as a board member of four.

=== London Borough of Ealing ===
In 1994, she became CEO of London Borough of Ealing, where she spent her early life. She continued working there for 12 years before moving to Victim Support, her first executive role in a charity.

=== Victim Support ===
Victim Support, a charity that supports victims of various crimes, hired Guy in 2006, where she worked for four years. In an interview, Guy characterized the move from public sector to charitable organization sector: "In the public sector, there was never enough money to do what you wanted; in the charity sector it's the same. It's always about getting more for less." Significantly, She consolidated Victim Support into one charity from a network of seventy-seven, according to The Guardian.

=== Citizens Advice ===
Guy was hired as the Chief Executive Officer of Citizens Advice in 2010. The charity, a network of independent charities across multiple countries, employs over 21,000 volunteers. In an interview with The Guardian, she noted that her experience at Victim Support prepared her for working cooperatively with the government.

Already Commander of the Order of the British Empire (CBE), Guy was appointed Dame Commander of the Order of the British Empire (DBE) in the 2020 New Year Honours for services to the public and voluntary sectors.

In August 2019, Guy admitted that Citizens Advice had been too slow to make progress on inclusivity and diversity under her leadership. This followed the publication of Citizens Advice training materials which the charity's own Black, Asian and ethnic minority staff group said "propagated racist stereotypes".

In August 2020, Citizen Advice announced that Gillian Guy would step down from the organization in October, after ten years of service. She would be followed by the Chief Operating Officer Alistair Cromwell until a permanent successor is elected.

=== Independent Assessor of the Financial Ombudsman Service ===
Guy is currently the Independent Assessor of the Financial Ombudsman Service.

== Personal life ==
Gillian Guy is married to Michael Bichard, Baron Bichard, and may be styled Lady Guy. They have three children.
