= Pension Wise =

UK government advice bureau

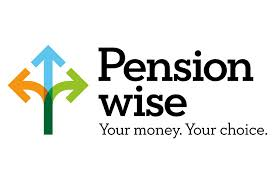
- Formation: 1995; 31 years ago
- Founder: Government of the United Kingdom
- Location: Bedford, United Kingdom
- Region served: United Kingdom
- Services: Advice and support
- Owner: Government of the United Kingdom
- Parent organization: Money and Pensions Service
- Affiliations: Citizens Advice, MoneyHelper
- Website: www.moneyhelper.org.uk/en/pensions-and-retirement/pension-wise

Pension Wise is a British free and impartial pension advice service operated by the government of the United Kingdom. Pension Wise guidance is delivered via telephone and face to face appointments or online. The service is available to people aged 50 years and over with a defined contribution pension to help them understand what they can do with their pension pot(s).

It offers guidance for people on the pension changes introduced in the 2014 United Kingdom budget. Under these changes those with a defined contribution pension scheme are no longer required to buy an annuity. Instead they are allowed to take as much or as little from their pension pot as they wish to invest or spend themselves. Oliver Wright of The Independent newspaper described this change as the biggest change to pensions in nearly a century.

As of 2021, there were more than 7.5 million visits to the Pension Wise website and more than 250,000 Pension Wise appointments. In 2015, the Pension Wise website was criticised by the Work and Pensions Select Committee as having a low take up of Pension Wise appointments. The Equity Release Council have recommended that Pension Wise be extended to allow advice on equity release.

== History ==
Responsibility for the service was initially under HM Treasury but moved to the Department for Work and Pensions in March 2016.

The cost of establishing and supporting the service in its first year was £35 million.

Telephone appointments were provided through The Pensions Advisory Service (TPAS), which was replaced in 2019 by the Money and Pensions Service, and face to face appointments through Citizens Advice. Appointments are delivered by over 150 guidance specialists whose training has been accredited by the Chartered Insurance Institute (CII) or the Pensions Management Institute (PMI). Pension Wise does not give specific product or provider recommendations. It also stops short of providing advice, which must still be delivered by a regulated financial adviser.

According to the Financial Conduct Authority in 2022, 46% of consumers who took part in their consumer survey had received guidance from Pension Wise.

== See also ==
- Pensions in the United Kingdom
