= Helen Reeves =

Dame Helen May Reeves DBE (born 22 August 1945) is a former Chief Executive of Victim Support in the UK. She retired in 2005 after 26 years with the organisation.

She has said that "[W]e believe an entirely new way of thinking about crime is needed – one that recognises the needs of victims of crime as the responsibility of the whole community, rather than leaving people to suffer in silence while we focus our attention on offenders." She wrote the afterword to Victims of Crime: A New Deal?

On 2 November 2004, she received an honorary Doctor of Laws degree from Southampton Institute, in recognition of her 'outstanding contribution' to victims' services.
