= Birmingham Council of Social Service =

The Birmingham Council of Social Service was a voluntary body that operated in Birmingham, England during the 1940s. Some of the first Citizens Advice Bureau in the United Kingdom were offshoots of the BCSS.
