= The Pensions Advisory Service =

Was a UK non-departmental public body

Pensions Advisory Service
- Successor: Money and Pensions Service
- Founded: 1983
- Founder: UK Government
- Dissolved: April 6, 2019
- Type: Non-departmental public body
- Location: London, United Kingdom
- Region served: United Kingdom
- Services: Pension advice and support
- Official languages: English and Welsh
- Owner: UK Government through Department for Work and Pensions
- Revenue: Grant added by UK Department for Work and Pensions
- Website: www.moneyandpensionsservice.org.uk

The Pensions Advisory Service (TPAS) was a British government body that provided free information, advice and guidance on state, company and individual pension schemes. Additionally they helped any member of the public who had a problem, complaint or dispute with their occupational or private pension arrangement. It was merged in 2019 to create its successor the Money and Pensions Service.

While it was operating it structured as a non-departmental public body and independent non-profit company limited by guarantee in the United Kingdom. It was funded by receiving grants from Department for Work and Pensions.

The service was provided by a nationwide network of volunteer advisers with the required knowledge and experience who were supported and augmented by a technical and administrative staff based in London.

== History ==
In January 2019 the UK government launched the Money and Pensions Service, combining the Money Advice Service, the Pensions Advisory Service and Pension Wise to form a single financial guidance body. The decision to merge the organisations into one body was originally announced in March 2016 by HM Treasury and confirmed in the Queen's Speech of June 2017.

In March 2021, MaPS announced that it would be consolidating its three legacy consumer brands into one brand called MoneyHelper, to provide a better and enhanced consumer experience and a single source of information and guidance.
