= 2018 United Kingdom budget =

- Presented: Monday 29 October 2018
- Country: United Kingdom
- Parliament: 57th
- Party: Conservative Party
- Chancellor: Philip Hammond
- Total revenue: £810 billion
- Total expenditures: £842 billion
- Deficit: £32 billion
- Website: Budget 2018

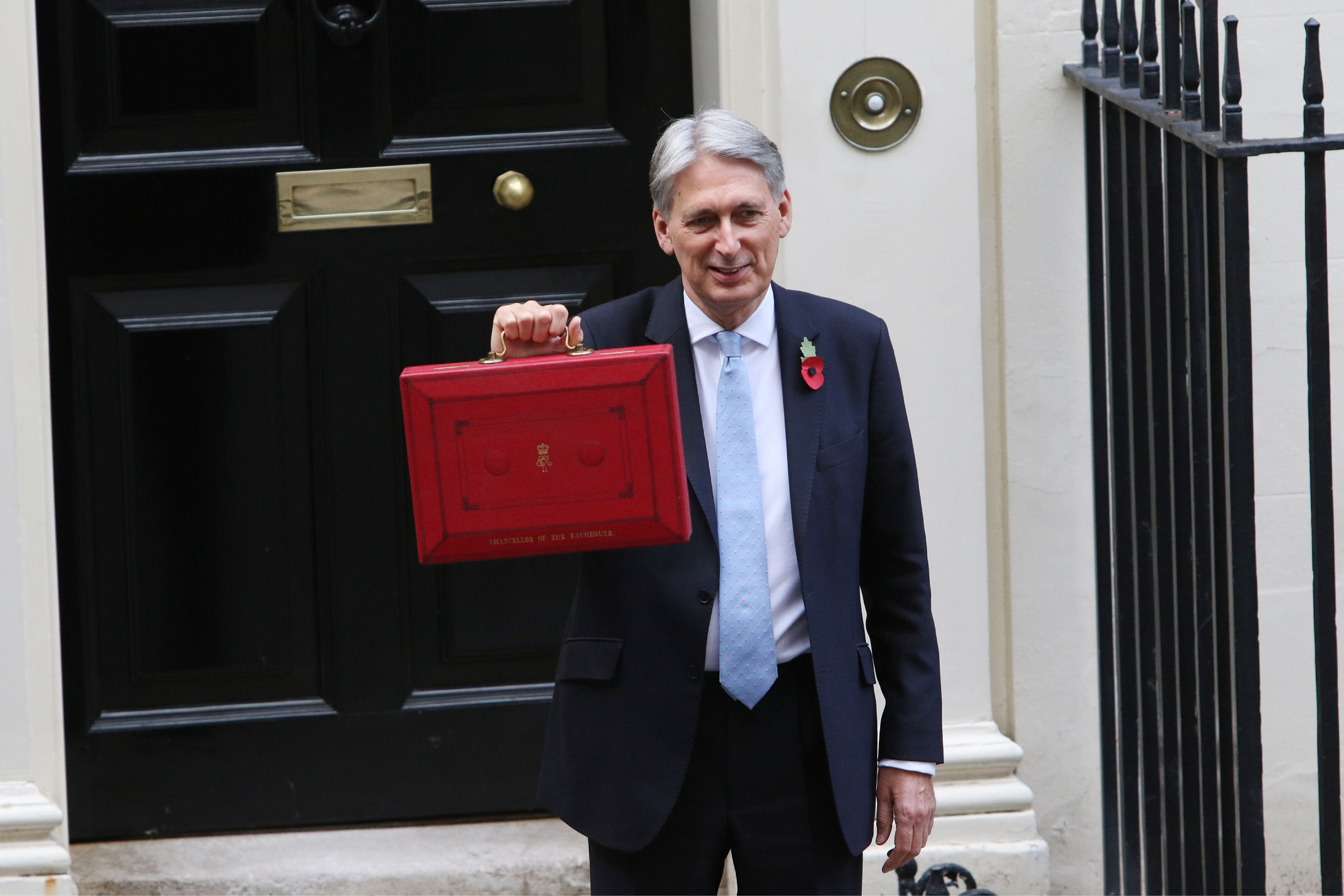
Chancellor Philip Hammond delivering his Budget Statement

The 2018 United Kingdom budget was delivered by Philip Hammond, the Chancellor of the Exchequer, to the House of Commons on Monday, 29 October 2018. It was Hammond's third as Chancellor of the Exchequer since being appointed to the role in July 2016, and his last before being replaced by Sajid Javid by means of Boris Johnson's cabinet reshuffle upon becoming prime minister in July 2019. Following the budget in March 2017 the government moved the annual budget to the Autumn, with the following budget held on 22 November of the same year. On 26 September 2018, Hammond announced that the 2018 budget would be held earlier, in October, so as to avoid clashing with the final stage of Brexit negotiations. On 28 October he suggested that a second budget would be needed in the event of a failure to negotiate a Brexit deal, since the scenario would require a "different response", with a need for "fiscal buffers" to provide support for the economy.

Delivering the budget statement, Hammond said that the era of austerity was "finally coming to an end". In response to pressure from Conservative MPs, the Chancellor announced an increase in Universal Credit for households with children, and people with disabilities, partially reversing reductions announced in 2015. The post-tax work allowances will increase by £1,000 per year, representing an extra £630 of income for about 2.4 million households in employment, ultimately at a cost of about £1.7 billion per year. Extra transitional support for claimants being moved to Universal Credit was also announced. Hammond announced that a fifty pence piece would be created to mark the UK's exit from the European Union.

Paul Johnson of the Institute for Fiscal Studies said that the budget did not end austerity. "Many public services are going to feel squeezed for some time to come. Cuts are not about to be reversed." Johnson also said, "If I were a prison governor, a local authority chief executive or a headteacher, I would struggle to find much to celebrate in the budget. I would be preparing for more difficult years ahead." The IFS maintains that "Total spending outside protected government departments is essentially flat, while it will fall on a per capita basis." The Resolution Foundation maintained that cuts to income tax would "overwhelmingly benefit richer households", and nearly half would go to the top 10% of households. Poorer households would continue to be affected by welfare cuts, despite Hammond claiming austerity was coming to an end.

== Spending impact ==
Taking advantage of Office for Budget Responsibility forecasts of increasing tax revenues from economic growth, the budget was largely a spending budget with a cost of £103 billion over the next six years.

The major tax and spend policy decisions in the budget, by their financial cost over 6 years, were:

Major policy decision financial impact (£ millions)
	2019-20	2023-24	2018-24 (over 6 years)
National Health Service spending increase	-7,350	-27,610	-83,580
Income Tax threshold increase	-2,790	-1,780	-9,555
Universal Credit increase to work allowance	-545	-1,695	-5,635
Local Authority Housebuilding borrowing cap removal	-385	-1,235	-4,655
Fuel Duty increase frozen 2019-20	-840	-935	-4,420
Capital allowance for new structures and buildings	-165	-585	-1,905
Universal Credit revised implementation schedule	-95	+250	+2,065
Extend anti-avoidance tax reforms to private companies	-150	+725	+2,965
Total spending policy decisions	-10,905	-30,520	-98,360
Total tax policy decisions	-4,180	-40	-5,110
Total policy decisions	-15,085	-30,560	-103,465

== Other measures ==
The budget announced that private finance initiative (PFI) contracts would no longer be used for new infrastructure projects, due to value-for-money considerations and the difficulties caused by the collapse of PFI construction company Carillion.

The budget included notice of a plan to consult on a new tax on produced or imported plastic packaging, to be applied where recycled content was less than 30% of the packaging material.
