= Money and Pensions Service =

UK government agency

- Predecessor: Money Advice Service, Pensions Advisory Service, Pension Wise
- Founded: 2019
- Headquarters: Bedford Borough Hall, Bedford
- Region served: United Kingdom
- Services: Debt advice and support
- Website: www.moneyandpensionsservice.org.uk

The Money and Pensions Service (sometimes stylised as Money & Pensions Service or MaPS) is a British organisation whose statutory objective is to develop and co-ordinate a national strategy to improve people's financial capabilities. The service provides impartial, free money and pensions guidance directly to consumers online and by telephone. Through partnerships, it also provides debt advice and pensions freedoms guidance to consumers, along with offering organisations such as employers syndicated money guidance content from its website.

The organisation was set up by the UK Government and is paid for by a statutory levy on the financial services industry. It is an arm's-length body of the Department for Work and Pensions. The organisation is headquartered in Bedford.

MaPS is the largest funder of debt advice in England. The service's chair is Sara Weller, who was appointed in 2023. Oliver Morley was appointed as CEO in 2023.

== History ==
The service was launched in January 2019, combining the Money Advice Service, The Pensions Advisory Service and Pension Wise to form a single financial guidance body. The decision to merge the organisations into one body was originally announced in March 2016 by HM Treasury and confirmed in the Queen's Speech of June 2017. In March 2021, MaPS announced that it would be consolidating its three legacy consumer brands into one brand called MoneyHelper, to provide a better and enhanced consumer experience and a single source of information and guidance.
