= Glasgow Care Foundation =

The Glasgow Care Foundation (previously the City of Glasgow Society of Social Service) is a charitable organisation set up in 1874 to assist those most in need.
