= European Citizen Action Service =

The European Citizen Action Service (ECAS) is a Brussels-based non-profit organisation that aims to empower the European Union's citizens, by promoting and defending their rights and making it easier for them to participate in deliberations and decision-making of the European Union's political institutions. It is a strong proponent of EU citizen rights and European democracy and is currently headed by its Executive Director Assya Kavrakova.
