= Victim Support =

Charity in England and Wales

Victim Support is an independent charity in England and Wales that provides specialist practical and emotional support to victims and witnesses of crime.

== Activities ==
Support for victims of crime
Trained volunteers and employees offer free, independent, confidential and personalised support to victims and witnesses of crime and traumatic incidents. In 2017, the charity had contact with over 800,000 victims of crime across England and Wales to offer information and support. The charity offers a range of support around safety, information provision, validation of their thoughts and feelings, developing coping strategies for daily life and connecting the services users with support networks as well. Examples of support specifics can be: supporting people to make their home secure after a burglary, understanding their rights and entitlements within the Victim's Code of Practice, support with the Criminal Justice System, applying for compensation, help with re-housing or accessing mental health and other specialised services through the NHS.
Supportline
A free 24/7 telephone helpline offering confidential support and advice to anyone affected by crime in England and Wales - 08 08 16 89 111.
Specialist services

- The national Homicide Service, helping families in England and Wales who've been bereaved by murder or manslaughter
- Local services helping victims of any crime, including domestic or sexual violence, anti-social behaviour and hate crime
- Local services for young victims of crime, including specialist support for children who have experienced domestic abuse, sexual assault and grooming
- Restorative justice programmes

Research
Victim Support's research team look into the issues facing victims of crime and make recommendations, based on evidence, on how to tackle those problems to government. police, criminal justice and other organisations.
Fundraising
The charity is funded by public donations along with funding awards made by grant-making bodies and services commissioned by Police and Crime Commissioners.
Volunteering
Volunteers are trained to work directly with victims and witnesses of crime or to be a fundraiser.

== History ==
Victims' services
The first Victim Support scheme was set up in Bristol in 1974. The charity's founders included staff from the National Association for the Care and Resettlement of Offenders (now NACRO), the police and probation services. By 1986, every county in England and Wales had at least one Victim Support scheme. Victim Support registered as a charitable company in 1987 and in 2008, all local services merged to create a single national federation in England and Wales.

Homicide Service
Since 1985, the charity has run the Homicide Service, supporting people bereaved by murder or manslaughter.

Witness Service
The charity set up the national Witness Service in 1989 and supported its development to cover both all Crown Court centres and all the magistrates' courts in England and Wales. The Witness Service was run by Victim Support until April 2015.

Supportline
In 1998, Victim Support's free national telephone helpline for victims and witnesses was established. Since the 2017 Westminster attack and the other terrorist attacks that year, the Supportline has been provided 24/7.

== Officials ==
- Chair: Andrew Tivey
- Chief Executive Officer: Katie Kempen

== Notable former officials ==
- Former Chief Executive: Dame Helen Reeves DBE. Dame Helen served the charity for 26 years, retiring in 2005. Other notable figures who helped Victim Support become a major force for victims in the early years include: Kathy Hobdell MBE, Ron Chick MBE, Sue Tomson, Kay Coventry, Sarah Cawthra, Jane Cooper, Martin Wright and John Pointing.

== Research reports ==
- "Survivor's Justice", December 2017
- "Responding to terror attacks", November 2017
- "Victim of the System", April 2017
- "Understanding Victims of Crime", April 2017
- "VS Insight Report: An Easy Target? Risk factors affecting victimisation rates for violent crime and theft", April 2016
- "Waiting for Justice: How victims of crime are waiting longer than ever for criminal trials", June 2015
- "Suffering in silence: children and unreported crime", December 2014
- "At risk, yet dismissed: the criminal victimisation of people with mental health problems" Report, October 2014
- Summary
- "Left in the dark – why victims of crime need to be kept informed", July 2011.
- "Criminal neglect: no justice beyond criminal justice", 2002
- Rights for Victims of Crime, 1995
