= Consumer movement =

Social movement to promote consumer protection

The consumer movement is an effort to promote consumer protection through an organized social movement, which is in many places led by consumer organizations. It advocates for the rights of consumers, especially when those rights are actively breached by the actions of corporations, governments, and other organizations that provide products and services to consumers. Consumer movements also commonly advocate for increased health and safety standards, honest information about products in advertising, and consumer representation in political bodies.

== Term ==
The terms "consumer movement" and "consumerism" are not equivalent. The traditional use of the term "consumerism" is still practiced by contemporary consumer organizations refers to advancing consumer protection and can include legislators passing consumer protection laws, regulators policing these laws, educators who teach consumer policy, product testers who measure the extent to which products meet standards. These cooperative organizations supply products and services mindfully of consumer interest, as well as the consumer movement itself. The term "consumer movement" refers to only nonprofit advocacy groups and grassroots activism to promote consumer interest by reforming the practices of corporations or policies of the government, so the "consumer movement" is a subset of the discipline of "consumerism".

In the 1960s in the United States lobbyists of the United States Chamber of Commerce and the National Retail Federation began using the term "consumerism" to refer to the consumer movement in a derogatory and antagonistic way. This was an attempt to denigrate the general movement and the work of Esther Peterson in her role as Special Assistant to the President for Consumer Affairs. Since that time, other people have confounded the term "consumerism" with the concepts of commercialism and materialism. Still, other people use "consumerism" to refer to a philosophy that the ever-expanding consumption of products is advantageous to the economy, and they contrast consumerism with the modern term "anti-consumerism" in opposition to the practice of over-consumption.

== Ideological foundations ==
Among the people whose ideas formed the basis of what became the consumer movement are the following:

- Thorstein Veblen, for introducing theories of advertising and the concept of conspicuous consumption
- Ellen Swallow Richards, for pioneering home economics as a science
- Herbert Hoover, for demanding product testing and a need for technical standards for products
- Upton Sinclair, for raising public interest in consumer protection
- Florence Kelley, for leading the National Consumers League
- Ralph Nader, for raising public awareness concerning automotive safety.

The event which historians recognize as launching the consumer movement was Frederick J. Schlink and Stuart Chase's publication of Your Money's Worth. The innovation which the publishing of this book brought about was the concept of product testing, which is the basis of the modern consumer movement.

== United States ==
=== Overview ===
Waves of the Consumer Movement in the United States
Period	New marketplace features	New media	Popular concern	Key people	Key publications	Key organizations	Key legislation	End of era
1900–1915	national distribution, product branding	Newspaper, magazine	Food safety, drug safety, stopping anti-competitive practices	Upton Sinclair, Florence Kelley, Harvey Wiley	The Jungle	National Consumers League	Pure Food and Drug Act, Wholesome Meat Act, Federal Trade Commission Act	World War I
1920s–30s	Mass production, home appliance, advertising using images	Radio	Criticism of advertising due to non-objective information, lack of representation in advertising regulation	Stuart Chase, Frederick J. Schlink, Arthur Kallet, Colston Warne	Your Money's Worth, 100,000,000 Guinea Pigs	Consumers Union, Consumers' Research, rural electrical cooperative organizations	Federal Food, Drug, and Cosmetic Act, Wheeler–Lea Act, Tugwell Bill	World War II
1960s–70s	Product proliferation, personal credit, complex new technology, greatly expanded international trade	Television	Safety standards, advertising's social impact, consumer redress for damage	Ralph Nader, Esther Peterson, Michael Pertschuk, Sidney M. Wolfe	Unsafe at Any Speed, The Poor Pay More	Consumer Federation of America, Public Citizen, American Council on Consumer Interests	National Traffic and Motor Vehicle Safety Act, Truth in Lending Act, Consumer Product Safety Act, Magnuson–Moss Warranty Act	Presidency of Ronald Reagan

=== Early corporate opposition ===
During the Recession of 1937–1938, public confidence in business was low and the new criticism from consumer groups weakened trust in advertising, media, and branded goods. The idea that the public were the "guinea pigs" on whom corporations tested products was an idea which spread after the publication of 100,000,000 Guinea Pigs, and industry sought to counter it and the general concept of consumer regulation over industry to restore market confidence. In 1938, Hearst Corporation ran an advertisement suggesting that people who purchase goods which were nationally distributed and advertised were not "guinea pigs", and from 1934 to 1939, Collier-Crowell executive Anna Steese Richardson toured to readers of Woman's Home Companion as an opponent of consumer groups and an advocate of corporate-managed equivalents of consumer organizations. To compete with grassroots efforts, various other corporate interests likewise set up their own consumer information centers, including New York Herald Tribune's product-testing institute, McCall's institute explicitly designed to counter Consumers Union and Consumers' Research, Sears consumer outreach lectures, N. W. Ayer & Son's Institute on Consumer Relations, and Macy's Bureau of Standards Fulton Oursler of Macfadden Publications published stories in True Story and Liberty which praised advertising and denounced the consumer movement, and which George Sokolsky used as the basis for writing an "anti-guinea pig" book, The American Way of Life.

In response to the trend of corporate movement into the field of consumer regulation of the marketplace, Robert Staughton Lynd spoke for consumer advocacy, stating that "the whole consumer movement can be aborted if the present plans of manufacturing and retailing trade associations to set up ... consumer pressure groups [are] allowed to go forward unchecked." Eventually, industry and companies began to portray citizens and organizations who criticized corporations as un-American and Communist. Conservative business interests attempted to correlate traditional American values such as freedom with advertising while making Communist threats against consumer organizations and the consumer movement as a whole. Though these attacks were widespread, they were not generally successful in convincing the general public that consumer activism was a Communist plot, at least at the end of the 1930s. In the next two decades, the American public began to take "red-baiting" much more seriously.

=== Second consumer movement ===
Opportunities Unlimited, a 1956 documentary on the benefits of consumer culture to society

Beginning in the 1960s–70s, scholars began to recognize "waves" of consumer activism, and much of the academic research on the consumer movement sorted it into "three waves of consumer activism". The first wave occurred at the start of the 20th century, the second wave in the 1920s and 1930s, and the third wave from the 1960s to the 1970s.

A number of factors contributed to the rise of the second consumer movement in the 1930s. The consumer activism of the early 1900s served as a foundation for the consumer movement that would follow in the 1930s and 1940s. The Great Depression also played a key role in igniting consumer concerns. As household finances grew tighter and consumers began to more carefully examine their commodities, Americans began to realize their poor quality and fraudulent advertising. American consumers relied on contemporary publications such as Your Money's Worth and 100,000,000 Guinea Pigs to expose fraud and misinformation from manufacturers and call for impartial product testing. These spawned consumer publications such as Consumers' Research and Consumers' Union which dedicated themselves to research and product testing to inform the consuming public. As these studies and exposes came to light, widespread support of a consumer's movement began to emerge. This included calls for higher food and commodity standards, consumer representation, and consumer education to teach responsible economic habits, as well as increased membership in consumer organizations, strikes, and consumer boycotts. Even those who opposed the second consumer movement, such as manufacturers and business professionals, began to recognize, in Lawrence B. Glickman's words, the "growing consumer consciousness" of the era. The broad interest in consumer issues led to several pieces of legislation being passed to create greater protections of quality and against fraudulent advertising, such the Tugwell Bill of 1933 which spawned more than a dozen other bills, like the Wheeler-Lea Act and the Food, Drug and Cosmetic Act of 1938. Women's groups in particular were influential in lobbying during the drafting of these reform bills.

==== National organization ====
Historians generally recognize that there are two areas under the umbrella of the second consumer movement: the "professional consumer organizations" and the "social movement organizations." Consumers' Research was the first of the former, founded in 1928 by Frederick J. Schlink and Stuart Chase primarily to perform product testing and determine the accuracy of contemporary advertisements. The other type consumer organizations primarily focused on the social aspects of the movement, bringing together coalitions of educated consumers to take action. Unlike majority male scientists in organizations such as Consumers' Research that tested product quality in laboratory settings, women activists were the lifeblood of the social organizations, loudly organizing protests and information campaigns. A major example of one of these consumer organizations is the League of Women Shoppers, founded in 1935 by a group of women influenced by the meat boycott in New York City. Middle and upper class urban women of high social standings formed the majority of the organization. The women of the organization spread consumer information and encouraged the average citizen to become educated on labor as well as consumer issues. They also deployed their own pickets lines and "buyers' strikes" as well as supported African American boycotts, such as the "Don't Buy Where You Can't Work" campaigns that discouraged African American consumers from shopping at businesses that refused to hire black employees. Another of these social organizations was the General Federation of Women's Clubs, which boasted a membership of over 2 million spread among 15,000 clubs nationwide. While their operations were not limited to the consumer movement, they completed studies on consumer issues and created outlines for consumers to follow while purchasing and exercising consumer power.

==== Grassroots organization ====
In addition to the national organizations of the consumer movement, grassroots organization was common during the second wave of consumer activism beginning in the 1930s. Women in particular played a key role in grassroots organizing around consumer issues. The Great Depression created physical and economic conditions that encouraged women, especially working-class housewives, to organize. One prominent example of grassroots consumer organizing in this period were the meat boycotts that took place across the United States in 1935. Over 10,000 housewives in Los Angeles began a boycott against inflated meat prices in March 1935, and similar boycotts sprang up across the country in cities such as Detroit and New York. The women organized committees, picketed, and pressured manufacturers to reduce prices and stop taking advantage of consumers, particularly during the difficult economic period. In New York, some of the women involved in the boycott even went on to found the League of Women Shoppers in the same year. In many cases, the pressure from these organizing women led to reductions in the prices of meat from modest to up to half-price, their activism allowing them to have a direct impact in the consumer market.

== Africa ==
African economies are heavily influenced by multinational corporations and lending institutions which have encouraged export-oriented industrialization. To become more attractive to investment in these circumstances, many governments become willing to tolerate unfavorable conditions such as anti-competitive practices, receiving lower quality imports than would be acceptable in other markets, enduring misleading product claims, and enduring increased exposure to hazardous waste. The majority of African countries implement the World Bank's structural adjustment programs to increase their attractiveness for international trade. The primary concerns for African consumers are balancing competitive business practices to give them access to products while discouraging unethical business conduct. The problems of African consumers are connected to other social problems of the region including extreme poverty, over-consumption of natural resources, the African refugee crisis, unstable employment, and the legacies of centuries of African slave trade.

Most of the members of the Southern African Development Community are members of the Common Market for Eastern and Southern Africa. In Western Africa, countries organize through the Economic Community of West African States. These and other organizations were founded to promote the development of markets and improve quality of life, but there is some history of fragmentation of organizations, duplication of efforts, and destructive competition between such organizations. The failure to settle disagreements and integrate the missions of various institutions contributes, along with other infrastructure problems, to inhibition of intraregional trade.

The consumer movement in Africa came into being over time as a result of three factors: the dissolution of the Soviet Union, the deregulation of markets by governments which are implementing structural adjustments, and the influence of external activist organizations like Consumers International supporting community efforts to promote consumer protection. The lessening influence of the Soviet Union made economies open to change, structural adjustments took governmental control out of markets, and activist groups put community control into markets. Consumer organizations in Africa often call for global integration of foreign economies into Africa and increased external consumption of Africa goods to improve local markets. They are frequently combined with human rights interests to increase democratization, economic development, and women's rights. The marketplace in Africa does not naturally promote economic democracy to the extent markets elsewhere would because frequently African markets provide few choices, and many activist groups tie the right to access goods with the right to enjoy benefits of democracy and economic development.

The Kenya Consumers' Organization, the Consumer Council of Zimbabwe, the Housewives League in South Africa, and the Institute for Consumer Protection in Mauritius are among the most prominent and oldest of consumer organizations, and these and most others formed before the late 1970s were founded by women. The organizations were vehicles to give women more equal access to basic goods and services and to connect women socially. In other places, consumer groups often partner with women's organizations. In 1998, two Consumers International conferences were held in Africa – an English conference was in Nairobi in June and attended by 100 participants from 11 African nations, and a French conference was in Dakar in November with participants from 16 West and Central African countries. The English language conference resulted in the publication of a declaration called "Consumers in Africa".

The contemporary consumer movement is among the fastest-growing social movements in Africa today. One indicator of this is membership of African consumer groups into Consumers International; in 1991, forty African countries had no representation in this network. Environmental Development Action in the Third World collaborated with Consumer International until 1994 and by 1995, only 15 countries were not participating and many countries had made stronger commitments to participation in the organized network. In 1994 50 delegates from Africa participated in the annual Consumers International World Congress and as a result, participated in the development of the Codex Alimentarius, General Agreement on Tariffs and Trade, and World Trade Organization issues. Participation in Consumers International has otherwise raised the profile of various consumer groups, such as Mali's Association des Consommateurs du Mali (ASCOMA) and Senegal's Association de Defense des Usagers de l'Eau l'Electricite, les Telecommunications et les Services (ADEETelS) have both had representation in government policymaking.

== India ==
Scholars most commonly view the modern consumer movement in India from two perspectives – that of consumer activism and that of business self-regulation. There is tradition in India which says that consideration for consumer rights began in the Vedic Period, and in these narratives, laws encourage merchants to practice honesty and integrity in business. Most discussion about India's consumer activism starts with a description of the Indian independence movement. At this time Gandhi and other leaders protested taxation of basic consumer products, such as during the Salt March, and encouraged people to make their own goods at home, as with the Khādī movement to promote spinning thread and weaving one's own textiles. These actions were to raise awareness that consumer purchase decisions fund the source of India's political control.

Gandhi promoted the idea that businesses have a trustee role in being responsible to the customers, workers, shareholders, and their community. In particular, Gandhi said that "A customer is the most important visitor on our premises. He is not dependent upon us. We are dependent upon him. He is not an interruption in our work – he is the purpose of it. We are not doing him a favour by serving him. He is doing us a favour by giving us the opportunity to serve him". United States consumer advocate Ralph Nader called Gandhi "the greatest consumer advocate the world has seen" for advancing the concept that commercial enterprise should serve the consumer and that the consumer should expect to be served by the business. Vinoba Bhave and Jayaprakash Narayan, two great proponents of Gandhi's philosophy, and V. V. Giri and Lal Bahadur Shastri, contemporary Indian president and prime minister, similarly expected the business community to regulate itself as an expression of responsibility to contribute to society. These ideas were developed by some business leaders. In July 1966 in Bombay some people founded the Fair Trade Practice Association, which was later renamed the Council for Fair Business Practice. This is now seen as a sincere effort toward promoting business self-regulation, despite consumer activists' criticism that self-regulation would not provide sufficient protection to consumers.

From the perspective of consumer activism, the Planning Commission backed the foundation of the Indian Association of Consumers in 1956 in Delhi to be a national base for consumer interests. For various reasons, it was not effective in achieving its goals. Other organizations were established in 1960 in various places in India but none were effective in achieving community organization. Leading on past failures, in Bombay in 1966 nine female homemakers founded the Consumer Guidance Society of India (CGSI) which remains one of India's most important consumer organizations. The most powerful consumer organization in India is the Consumer Education and Research Centre (CERC), founded in 1978 in Ahmedabad as part of the "social action litigation movement". At that time in society, courts started recognizing social workers and public interest groups as consultants on behalf of individuals or classes of people whose rights had been violated but who could not easily speak for themselves. Since its founding CERC has become among the most successful consumer organizations of the developing world in terms of its achievements of litigating on behalf of consumers. The Consumer Protection Act of 1986 (COPRA) was mostly a result of intensive lobbying by CERC and CGSI.

In 1991, the Economic liberalisation in India radically changed the Indian marketplace by opening India to foreign trade and foreign investment.

It was thought that passage of the Consumer Protection Act in India in 1986 would encourage consumers to stand up for their rights and lead to an overwhelming number of disputes in consumer courts. Although a consumer movement has yet to get going in India, the existence of the act has stimulated the creation of many consumer organizations across the country. The number of such organizations has more than doubled in the last few years so that there are now 600–800 organizations in the voluntary sector. The movement has not blossomed because not all of the organizations are active enough to make an impact, there has hardly been any unified action which would demonstrate their strength, and there has been no active consumer participation in the movements. Consumers claim that the lack of consumer education makes them passive and apathetic, and blame consumer organizations. The majority of consumers in the country are even unaware of the existence of consumer courts to which they take their grievances. Some organizations counter that they lack sufficient funds and blame the government for their inaction. The author acknowledges criticism that the Indian consumer movement is elitist and considers the need to focus upon rural consumers, the significant contributions that organizations have made in laying the foundations for change, the need for consumer education, the need for specialists, the particular need for consumer protection with regard to health-related products, and support by voluntary health groups.
