= Early history of food regulation in the United States =

The history of early food regulation in the United States started with the 1906 Pure Food and Drug Act, when the United States federal government began to intervene in the food and drug businesses. When that bill proved ineffective, the administration of President Franklin D. Roosevelt revised it into the Federal Food, Drug and Cosmetic Act of 1937. This has set the stage for further government intervention in the food, drug and agricultural markets.

== The Pure Foods Movement ==
The Pure Foods Movement of the 1870s was a grass-roots movement creating the "principal source of political support for the Pure Food and Drugs Act of 1906". It was a coalition of many different groups, which is why it became so influential. The following explains the influential groups and individuals involved, as it was not an official coalition, rather a movement created by different individual interests.

=== Impact of women's clubs ===
The Ladies Health Protective Association was the first women's group to join the pure foods movement. Starting in 1884, they began a campaign to rid New York City of unsanitary slaughter houses. These women were "energized to take legal action almost as much by the attitude of the city bureaucrats [who were apathetic] was by the need to protect their families and the neighborhood". If the city agency in charge of regulating slaughterhouses had been willing to listen to the Association and clean up the slaughterhouses, the women would have never continued their crusade. However, after a hearing, a slaughterhouse owner refused to clean up his property and this caused the women to pursue the execution of the penalty and continue a "constant vigilance" to keep it from happening again.

Inspired by the Association, 11 other city health protective associations grew out of the need to clean up stockyards and slaughterhouses. In Louisiana, Mrs. Richard Bloor took individual action and visited a packinghouse and afterwards "sent a description of the conditions to Upton Sinclair to use in his exposés of the meat industry". The Women's Christian Temperance Union (WCTU) was borne out of a need to protect communities from alcohol abuse and worked mostly on the local level.

Working mostly only on a local level, they set the tone for the Pure Food movement that would soon follow. Many club women were heavily involved in the temperance movement and began to associate adulterated foods as having the same consequences as alcohol abuse. This is because both inflicted harm on communities. Both were common abuses prevalent in poor communities, and led to malnourishment, violence and other social problems. Women’s organizations began addressing these issues and broadened their activities beyond normal WCTU activities and more women who wanted to protect their communities joined their cause. Members of the WCTU, the Ladies Health Protective Association, and women's clubs laid the foundation for further "pure food, drink, and drug campaigns in the early 1880s, while their activities centered around study, self-improvement, and philanthropy".

=== Harvey W. Wiley ===
Harvey W. Wiley became the leader of the pure foods crusade. When Wiley was appointed, he decidedly set the Division of Chemistry in a different direction. He expanded the Division's research and conducted the Foods and Food Adulterants study, which demonstrated his concern about chemicals used in food. He also created the "Poison Squad" experiments, in which young, healthy men volunteered to ingest food additive chemicals to determine their impact on human health. Wiley unified many different concerned groups, including state inspectors, the General Federation of Women's Clubs, journalists, reform wing of business, congress members and associations of physicians and pharmacists. As Wiley worked to bring awareness to the pure foods crusades, it gained momentum and legitimacy. His "poison squad" brought national awareness to the problem, whereas women's groups brought local attention to the cause.

=== Upton Sinclair and The Jungle ===
In 1906, Upton Sinclair published The Jungle, a book which exposed the filthy conditions of Chicago slaughterhouses. Sinclair wrote the book while living in Chicago; he talked to workers and their families and his focus was the plight of the workers. However, the book turned people away from "tubercular beef" instead of turning them socialist like Sinclair wanted. The book was a best seller and the public outcry prompted President Theodore Roosevelt to send officials to investigate. Their “report was so shocking that its publication would ‘be well-nigh ruinous to our export trade in meat’”. This report, Neill-Reynolds, underscored the terrible conditions illustrated by Sinclair. It indicated a need for "'a drastic and thorogooing [sic]' federal inspection of all stockyards, packinghouses and their products". The Jungle, combined with the shocking reports of the Neill-Reynolds Report (published June 1906) proved to be the final push to help the Pure Food and Drug Act move quickly through congress.

== The 1906 Pure Food and Drug Act (Wiley Act) ==
=== Origins ===
Before the 1906 Pure Food and Drug Act, most food oversight was mandated to state laws, which were enacted during the colonial days and served mainly trade interests. They set standards of weight, and "provided for inspections of exports like salt meats, fish and flour". In 1848, the first national law concerned with regulating food come out of the Mexican–American War, and "banned the importation of adulterated drugs". Food inspection was largely thought to be the duty of the consumer, not the government.

==== Changes in technology ====
With the advent of modern machinery, food production (especially grain) moved forward at an alarming pace. For example, the “canning line” increased the efficiency of canning foods in an industrial setting. An 1886 report by the Illinois Bureau of Labor Statistics claimed that “New machinery has displaced fully 50 percent of the muscular labor formerly required to do a given amount of work”. Because of these improvements to agriculture, packaged cereals and canned foods became popular. Synthetic medicines (made in labs instead of natural medicines) and chemicals that altered the growing and processing of food began to appear.

==== Processed food ====
Processed food was more easily transported, thanks to improvements in transportation. Chemical additives were used to "heighten color, modify flavor, soften texture, deter spoilage, and even transform ... apple scraps, glucose, coal-tar dye, and timothy seed" into a "strawberry jam". However, for these new products, there was no regulation and manufacturers were able to put whatever ingredients they wanted in products like “tonics” without having to list them. Products were often labeled and packaged to appear larger than they were, or packaged to appear to have a higher concentration of food.

This began to worry high-quality producers who worried that their products might be undermined by deceitful goods. Farmers felt threatened by unfair competition as shady producers adulterated "fertilizers, deodorized rotten eggs, revived rancid butter, and substituted glucose for honey". Real strawberry jam producers felt threatened by the bad strawberry “spread” substitutes, since consumers could not tell the difference while buying.

=== Court response ===
The first court case involving "adulterated" products was in 1886, in which farmers pitted quote “the reigning champion, butter, against a challenger, oleomargarine. Butter won and oleomargarine was taxed". "Adulterated" products often used chemicals or additives to mask poor quality wheat, sour milk, or meat gone bad. In response, these "unethical" companies asserted that it was a consumer’s duty to protect themselves from shoddy products. The Division of Chemistry started looking into the adulteration of agricultural commodities around 1867, and in 1883 Harvey Washington Wiley was appointed chief chemist.

=== Provisions of the act ===
The law "forbade interstate and foreign commerce in adulterated and misbranded food and drugs". If a product was found to be in violation, it could be seized and condemned; if a seller was found violating they could be fined and jailed. The law did not define food standards by chemists, but it did prohibit the "adulteration of food by the removal of valuable constituents, the substitution of ingredients so as to reduce quality, the addition of deleterious ingredients and the use of spoiled animal and vegetable products". Misleading or false labeling was now considered misbranding and thus illegal.

=== Effects of the act ===
The 1906 US Pure Food and Drug Act “defined food adulterations as a danger to health and as consumer fraud”. The “Meat Inspection Act,” which accompanied the law, made tax payers pay for the new regulation. The Department of Chemistry was transformed into a regulatory body charged with regulating packaging, labeling and protecting the consumer. The jam industry was one of the first to be subject to regulation. If a jam did not fit a certain standard of fruit-to-sugar-to-pectin ratio, it bore a “Compound Jam” label. After World War One, these companies, like BRED-SPRED, started aggressive marketing campaigns and attractive packaging to promote themselves. Branded with ‘distinctive names’ like “Peanut Spread” and “Salad Bouquet,” they sold a weak product (like a low ratio of peanuts, or weak vinegar) as high-quality substitutes. Similar deceptive labeling in canned foods prompted the McNary-Mapes Amendment in 1930 which “authorized standards of quality, condition, and/or fill-of-containers.” If a product was sub-standard, it had to display a ‘crepe label’ which read ‘below US standard, low quality, but not illegal’.

=== The American Chamber of Horrors ===
Aided by Eleanor Roosevelt, the "American Chamber of Horrors" helped illuminate the deficiencies in the old 1906 Act. Launched in 1933 with the book 100,000,000 Guinea Pigs by Arthur Kallet and Frederick J. Schlink, the U.S. Food and Drug Administration (FDA) put on an exhibit to illustrate the need for a new law. Eleanor Roosevelt toured it to help elevate its status as a public relations tool. It showed jars with deceptive labeling and packaging which, in the case of jarred chicken, hid dark meat and was jarred in deceptive containers which seemed larger than they were.

Included were examples of harmful drugs, including Banbar, a “cure” for diabetes, protected under the 1906 law, and Lash Lure, an eyelash dye that caused many of its women users to go blind. Also legal under the old law was Radithor, a “radium-containing tonic that sentenced users to a slow and painful death.” This, along with the above court cases, caused the FDA to focus on replacing the now outdated “Wiley Act” of 1906.

== The Federal Food, Drug and Cosmetic Act of 1938 ==
The Federal Food, Drug and Cosmetic Act was signed by President Franklin D. Roosevelt on June 25, 1938. The first attempt at reform, The “Tugwell Bill” was a “legislative disaster”. Spurred by public outcry from the Elixir Sulfanilamide disaster (in which 100 people were killed because under the 1906 law, “premarketing toxicity testing was not required”), congress rushed to enact a new bill. Even with the Elixar disaster, the bill itself was not subject to much public awareness.

=== Provisions of the act ===
This resulted in the 1938 Food, Drug and Cosmetic Act which “pioneered policies designed to protect the pocketbooks of consumers and food standards were enacted to ensure the ‘value expected’ of consumers”. “It changed the drug focus of the Food and Drug Administration from that of a policing agency primarily concerned with the confiscation of adulterated drugs to a regulatory agency increasingly involved with overseeing the evaluation of new drugs”.

=== Changes from the 1906 Pure Food and Drug Act ===
The following is a list of substantial changes from the previous 1906 law

- Drug manufacturers were required to provide scientific proof that new products could be safely used before putting them on the market.
- Cosmetics and therapeutic devices were regulated, for the first time.
- Proof of fraud was no longer required to stop false claims for drugs.
- Addition of poisonous substances to foods was prohibited except where unavoidable or required in production. Safe tolerances were authorized for residues of such substances, for example pesticides.
- Specific authority was provided for factory inspections.
- Food standards were required to be set up when needed “to promote honesty and fair dealing in the interest of consumers.”
- Federal court injunctions against violations were added to the previous legal remedies of product seizures and criminal prosecutions.
