= Mary Catherine Phillips =

American consumer advocate and author (1903–1981)

- Born: 1903
- Died: 1981 (aged 77–78)
- Education: Wellesley College
- Occupations: Consumer advocate, author
- Writing career
- Pen name: M. C. Phillips
- Notable works: Skin Deep. The Truth About Beauty Aids – Safe and Harmful

Mary Catherine Phillips (1903–1981) was an American consumer advocate, author, and member of the Board of Directors of Consumers' Research in Bowerstown, New Jersey. She tested consumer beauty products, promoted safety for cosmetics, and wrote Skin Deep. The Truth About Beauty Aids – Safe and Harmful.

== Career ==
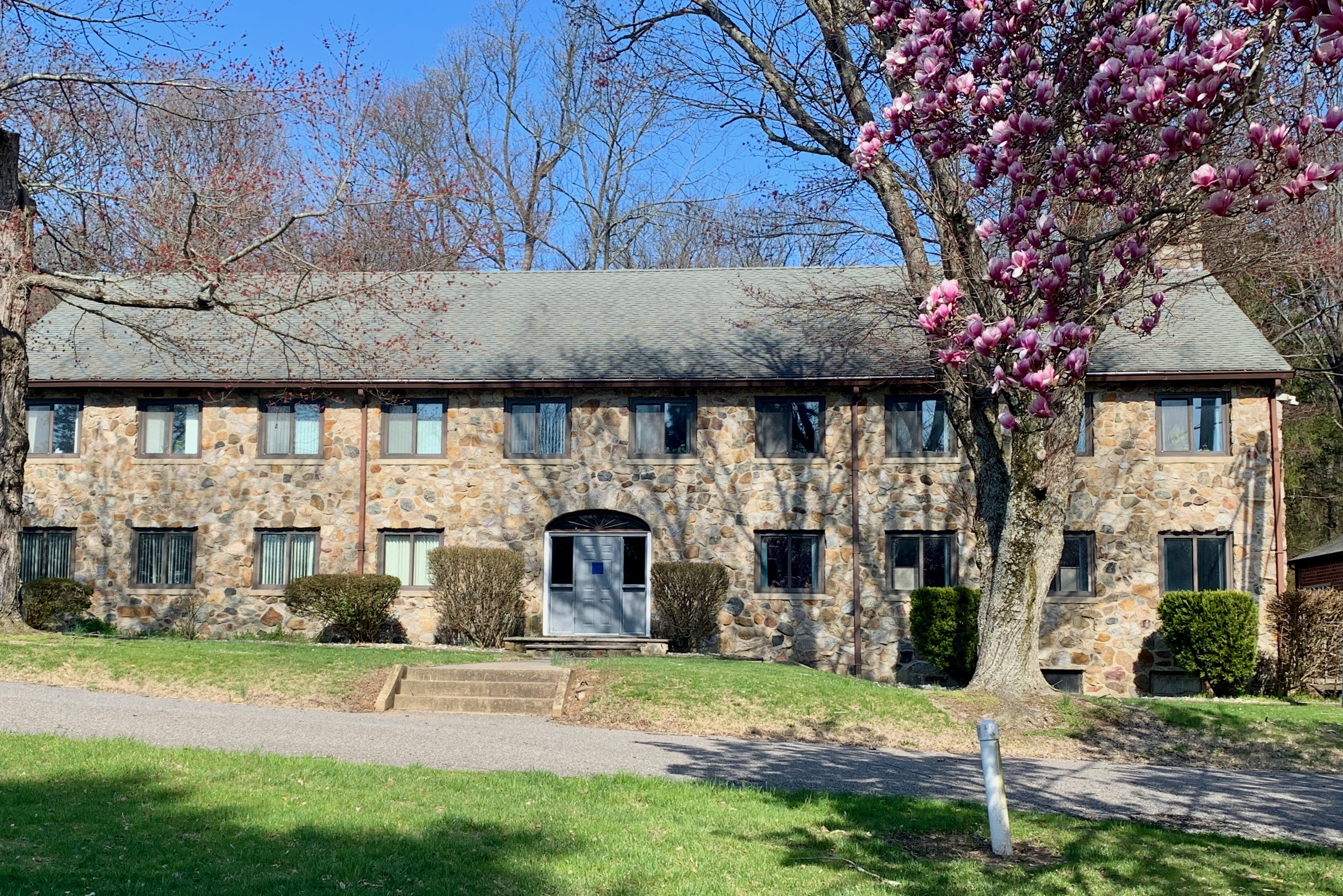
Consumers' Research offices in Bowerstown, New Jersey

Phillips was hired by Consumers' Research in 1932. Her main area of work was testing consumer beauty products. She was a member of the Board of Directors from 1934 to 1980. In 1934, she wrote the book, Skin Deep. The Truth About Beauty Aids – Safe and Harmful, about the cosmetics industry, using her initials, M. C. Phillips. The book was described as "entirely frank and fearless" in a review by The New York Times. It was a best seller that year and provided support for the Federal Food, Drug, and Cosmetic Act passed in 1938. She later wrote the sequel, More Than Skin Deep, in 1948.

In 1935, workers at Consumers' Research complained about working conditions, formed a union chapter, and subsequently went on strike. The Board of Directors, including Phillips, rejected negotiations and accused the workers of being Communists. The workers then formed a new company, Consumers Union, now known as Consumers Reports.

In the first issue of Consumers' Digest by Consumers' Research, January 1937, she was the associate editor. She wrote the magazine article Face Powders in 1938. In January 1939, she was the editor of the magazine, now published by the Consumers' Institute of America.

== Personal life ==
Phillips was born in either Clifton or Upper Montclair, New Jersey, in 1903. In 1924, she received a bachelor of arts degree from Wellesley College. In 1932, she married Frederick J. Schlink, co-founder of Consumers' Research. She died in 1981.

== Works ==
- Phillips, M. C. (1934). Skin Deep: The Truth About Beauty Aids – Safe and Harmful. New York: The Vanguard Press. OCLC 1002151.
- Phillips, M. C.; Schlink, F. J. (1934). Discovering Consumers. New York: John Day Company. OCLC 29014354.
- Phillips, M. C. (1948). More Than Skin Deep. New York: R. R. Smith. OCLC 1456565.
- Schlink, F. J.; Phillips, M. C. (1946). Meat Three Times a Day. New York: R. R. Smith. OCLC 621527.
- Schlink, F. J.; Phillips, M. C. (1966). Don't You Believe It!!. New York: Pyramid. OCLC 4619318.

== See also ==
- New Jersey Women's Heritage Trail
- List of The New York Times number-one books of 1935#Nonfiction
