= Consumers' Research =

US non-profit organization

Consumers Research Inc
- Formation: Tax exempt since June 1939; 87 years ago
- Founder: Stuart Chase; Frederick J. Schlink
- Type: 501(c)(3)
- Headquarters: Vienna, Virginia
- Revenue: $9.39 million (2024)
- Expenses: $9.35 million (2024)
- Website: consumersresearch.org

Consumers' Research is an American conservative 501(c)(3) non-profit organization. Established in 1929, it was a founding organization in the consumer protection movement. It turned to the right after its sale in 1981 to a conservative publisher.

The organization was established by Stuart Chase and F. J. Schlink after the success of their book Your Money's Worth galvanized interest in testing products on behalf of consumers. It published a monthly magazine called Consumers' Research Bulletin. Leading staff from this organization, thwarted in their efforts to establish a collective bargaining unit of a labor union, protested and left to form Consumers Union in 1936. The magazine published by Consumers Union, initially Consumers Union Reports and now called Consumer Reports, gained popularity and market share over the Bulletin and largely supplanted its relevance.

The organization stopped assessing products in the 1980s after its acquisition by M. Stanton Evans and was mostly dormant by the early 2000s. It was resuscitated in the 2020s as a Republican-aligned group. It has launched campaigns targeting "wokeness", including "woke capitalism" and environmental, social, and corporate governance (ESG) initiatives in corporate America.

== Early history ==
Consumers' Research published comparative test results on brand-name products and publicized deceptive advertising claims.

=== Founding ===
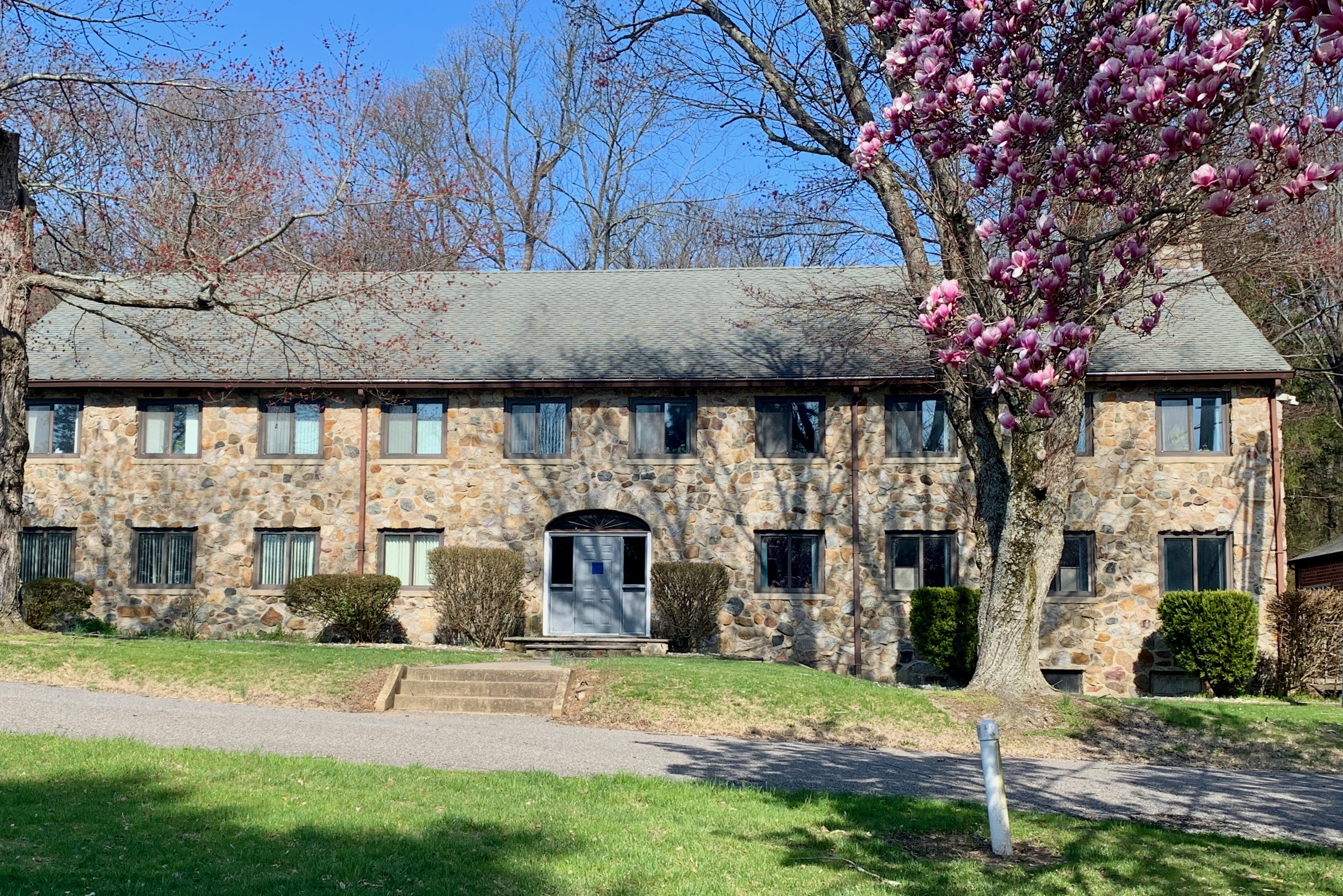
Bowerstown offices of Consumers' Research, built 1934–35

In 1927 Schlink and Chase, encouraged by the public response to the publishing of their book Your Money's Worth, solicited financial, editorial, and technical support from patrons of other activist magazines to support the creation of an organization to offer consumers the unbiased services of "an economist, a scientist, an accountant, and goodness knows what more." Schlink founded this organization, Consumers' Research, and migrated the existing subscriber base of a White Plains, New York organization's Consumer's Club Commodity List to support the Consumers' Research Bulletin published by his new organization. This was a publication with the mission to "investigate, test and report reliably … hundreds of common commodities purchased." This magazine would "accept no money or compensation of any kind from manufacturers, dealers, advertising agencies or other commercial enterprises." In 1927 the circulation of the bulletin was 565; by 1932 there were 42,000 subscribers. In addition to the magazine the organization also published books, pamphlets, and reports.

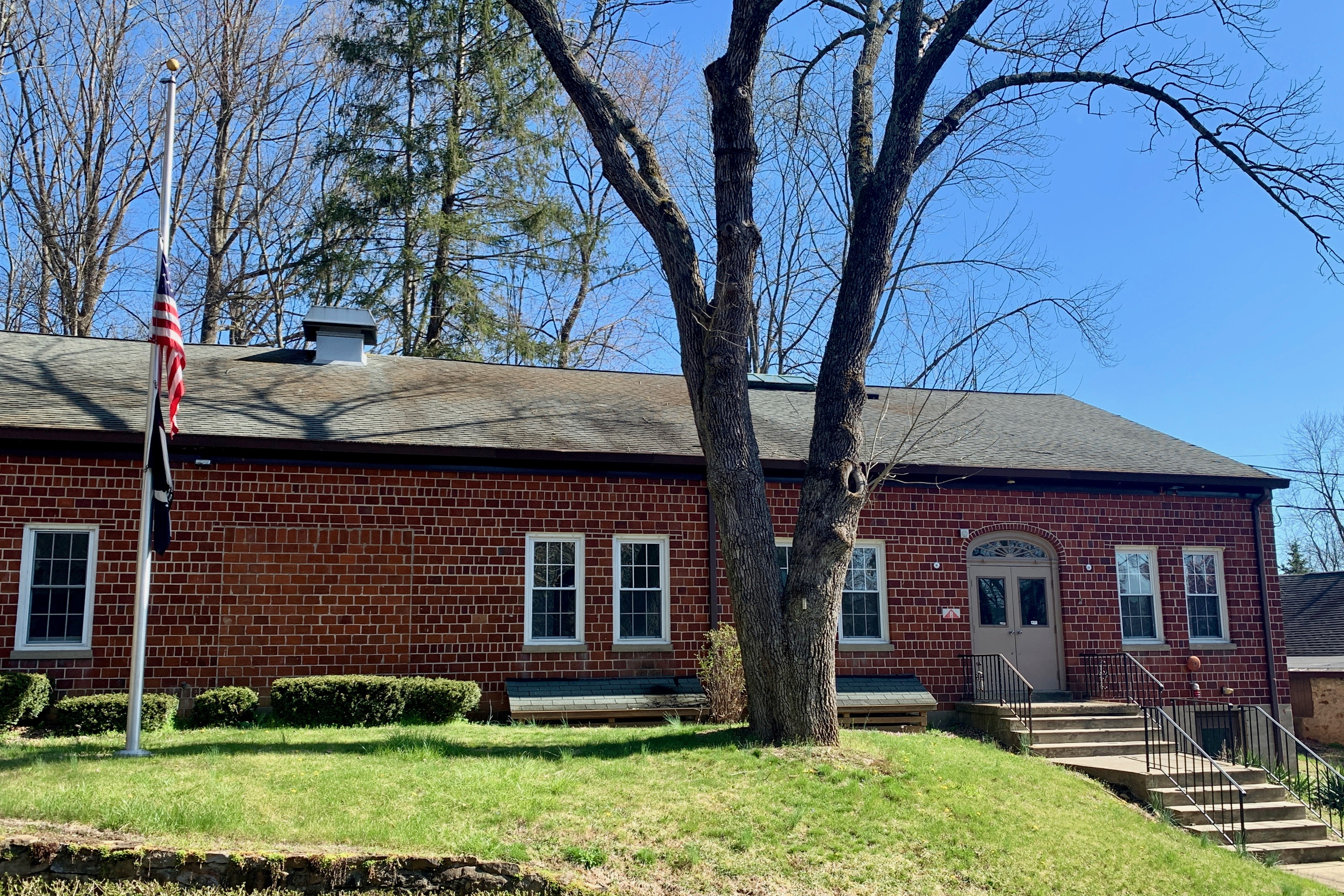
Research laboratory, built 1939–40

In 1933, Schlink and Arthur Kallet, a board member of Consumers' Research and former colleague of Schlink at the American Standards Association, published 100,000,000 Guinea Pigs. The book was to become one of the best-selling books of the decade and the metaphor of consumers being guinea pigs exploited by commercial enterprises moved readers as an appropriate description of the public during the Depression. Consumers' Research moved in 1933 to Washington, New Jersey and later the Bowerstown in Washington Township, New Jersey. After the move Schlink began to take more control over the management of the organization and rapidly hired and fired many staff. When Schlink established Consumers’ Research he appointed his wife and close friends to compose the majority of seats on the board of directors, and staff noted that he held control of hiring, firing, and the organization's editorial and budget decisions. When the organization grew the staff began to question its mission.

=== Schlink's control and resulting protests ===
In 1927 at the start of publication Consumers' Research Bulletin discussed conceptual issues, but by 1934 ratings of products and guidance for purchases filled more than 75% of each issue. Around this time Chase left the organization to pursue other interests, and Schlink began to take more control over management. By 1935 Consumers’ Research had a staff of 50, used 200 consultants, and was sponsored by such respected and established journalists such as Alexander Crosby of The Nation, Arthur Kellog of The Survey, and George Soule of The New Republic. Each of these also wrote in their own magazines about consumer activism.

In the spring of 1935, the workers began to openly complain about management practices. In August 1935 many workers formed a chapter of the Technical, Editorial, and Office Assistant's Union. In response to this, Schlink fired John Heasty, the appointed president of the union, and the union organizers responded with a strike at Consumers Research. Schlink counter-responded to the strike by hiring strikebreakers and armed security and by filing legal grievances against protestors. The negative publicity this dispute attracted pleased Consumers' Research critics.

=== Kallet seeks a solution ===
The positions between Consumers' Research and the strikers became more entrenched and less reconcilable, and the strikers began to have more discussions about the working conditions of employees. Arthur Kallet emerged as a leader who proposed the creation of a new organization which would evaluate products and take into account the working conditions under which those products were created. The organization proposed would also engage in and promote boycotts, educational campaigns, and have alliances with other organizations, which were activities Consumers Research avoided.

At the end of 1935, the protesters called for mediation. Reinhold Niebuhr, a religious philosopher, chaired an arbitration group which included the American Civil Liberties Union's Roger Nash Baldwin, the educator George Counts, and the socialist Norman Thomas. Schlink rejected this arbitration and the Consumers' Research board of directors accused the strikers of being communists.

The new organization, Consumers Union, which was founded by Kallet and an Amherst College professor Colston Warne, published its first magazine Consumers Union Reports in May 1936. The previous strike was very successful at drawing attention to the protesters and the magazine was founded with public attention and support. Within two years the circulation of this new magazine surpassed the subscriptions to Consumers' Research Bulletin, which the organization continued to publish. As of 1987 it had less than 1% of the subscribers which Consumers Union's magazine had.

=== Accomplishments ===
From its New Jersey location, Consumers' Research continually organized petitions to Franklin D. Roosevelt urging him to establish a federal Department of the Consumer. This department would organize all consumer protection agencies and have as goals the prevention of monopoly and prevention of fraud to consumers. Because of Consumers' Research, and women's groups, and home economics activists, there were a Consumer Advisory Board, a labor advisory committee, and a business advisory committee in the National Recovery Administration. In 1933 Roosevelt appointed Mary Harriman Rumsey to head the Consumer Advisory Board. Caroline F. Ware, Paul Douglas, Walton Hale Hamilton, and Dexter Keezer were other consumer representatives involved in this effort.

=== Legacy ===
Consumers' Research was a founding organization in the consumer protection movement.

The establishment of Consumers Union, directly resulting from the staff dismissals and walkouts from Consumers' Research, was one of the major events influencing the consumer movement after World War I. Other important organizations formed in the same era were the New Deal programs aimed at promoting economic recovery after the Great Depression by increasing consumer representation in the market, with the Consumer Advisory Board within the National Recovery Administration and the Consumers' Counsel within the United States Department of Agriculture being notable among them.

== Later history ==
=== 1980s sale and turn to conservatism ===
In 1981, Consumers' Research was sold to conservative commentator M. Stanton Evans. Evans had chaired the American Conservative Union, led the National Journalism Center, and served as editor for National Review and Human Events. The organization moved its headquarters to Washington, D.C., and abandoned assessing products, closing its New Jersey testing laboratories by 1983. The organization relied on reports from the government for its articles and saw a decrease in readership for its magazine. Evans held the role of editor at the magazine until 2002.

In March 2020, Will Hild became the organization's executive director. From 2020 to 2021, the annual budget of Consumers' Research budget increased from $800,000 to $8 million, with significant funding coming from Donors Trust, which as a donor advised fund allows for donor anonymity.

=== Targeting ESG ===
The organization has become a key actor in conservative efforts to limit socially responsible investing, particularly environmental, social, and corporate governance (ESG) initiatives by corporations. Consumers' Research is the main donor to the Republican-led State Financial Officers Foundation.

In December 2022, Consumers' Research and 13 state attorneys general called for an investigation of the investment management firm The Vanguard Group. The investment firm caved, withdrawing its pledges to cut greenhouse gas emissions and leaving the Net Zero Asset Managers Alliance coalition. The coalition folded as a result.

In 2025, The Atlantic reported that "expectations for ESG have now fallen off dramatically—and Hild and his three colleagues at Consumers' Research can claim much of the credit."

=== Targeting "wokeness" ===
Consumers' Research has also levied attacks against companies it alleges promote liberal agendas. In 2021, Consumers' Research launched an ad campaign to combat "wokeness" in corporate America, targeting companies by name, including Major League Baseball, Ticketmaster, Coca-Cola, American Airlines and Nike. In 2023, Consumers' Research launched a "woke alerts" digital advertising campaign that has targeted companies including Target, Bank of America, Disney, BlackRock, and Anheuser-Busch, which was the subject of a consumer boycott of Bud Light in 2023 in which Consumers' Research played a central role.

In 2022, insurance company State Farm partnered with GenderCool, a group whose mission is to present positive stories about transgender and nonbinary youth, to support a program providing LGBTQ-themed children's books to teachers and libraries in Florida. Consumers' Research ran an advertising campaign calling State Farm "a creepy neighbor" and accusing the insurance company of targeting children with books about gender identity. After an online uproar, State Farm dropped its support of the GenderCool partnership.

In 2022, Consumers' Research launched a multi-million dollar advertising campaign targeting BlackRock and Larry Fink over environmental, social, and corporate governance (ESG) investments. In 2023, Consumers' Research gave congressional leaders "a detailed roadmap for dismantling the environmental, social and governance (ESG) movement," calling ESG "an existential threat to our liberty." The report alleged that "some of the largest asset managers in the world have leveraged Americans' savings to coerce corporations to adopt critical race theory, boycott states with Republican governments, fund employees' abortions, and divest from investment in drilling for oil and natural gas, among a wide range of other left-wing causes."

As of 2025, 23 Republican state attorneys general had begun investigations into ESG-focused asset management firms since 2022. A spokesman for Leonard Leo told The Atlantic that "woke companies are defrauding their consumers and poisoning our culture," and that "Will Hild and Consumers' Research...crush liberal dominance in those woke companies and hold them accountable."

== See also ==
- Consumer Reports
