= The Consumer Movement =

1941 book by Helen Sorenson

- Author: Helen Sorenson
- Subject: consumer movement
- Publisher: Harper and Brothers
- Publication date: 1941
- Publication place: United States
- Pages: 245

The Consumer Movement is a 1941 book on the consumer movement by Helen Sorenson.

== Reviews ==
One reviewer said that the book describes the consumer movement by describing what contemporary consumer organizations are doing as activism.

A reviewer for Kirkus Reviews said that the book describes "consumer group organization, the variety of interests that constitute the consumer movement, the definite objectives of consumer groups, the spread of services, testing agencies, committees, leagues, associations of all kinds and their power as consumer groups".
