= The Medical Letter on Drugs and Therapeutics =

- Discipline: Pharmacology
- Language: English, French, Italian

Publication details
- History: 1959-present
- Publisher: The Medical Letter, Inc.
- Frequency: Biweekly

Standard abbreviations
- ISO 4: Med. Lett. Drugs Ther.

Indexing
- CODEN: MELEAP
- ISSN: 1523-2859
- LCCN: 00211546
- OCLC no.: 40606056

Links
- Journal homepage

The Medical Letter on Drugs and Therapeutics (commonly referred to as The Medical Letter) is a peer-reviewed biweekly medical journal providing evaluations of pharmaceutical drugs. It is published in English, French, and Italian. The journal is abstracted and indexed in Index medicus/MEDLINE/PubMed. An offshoot, Treatment Guidelines from the Medical Letter (ISSN 1541-2792) was published from 2002 to 2014, when it was integrated into this journal.

== Editorial process ==
Articles for The Medical Letter are drafted by either an editor or external consultant using both published and available unpublished studies that are reviewed for methodological rigor with special attention to the results of clinical trials. A preliminary draft is circulated to every member of the advisory board and 10-20 other investigators with relevant clinical or experimental experience with the article's topic. Drafts are also provided to the Food and Drug Administration and Centers for Disease Control and Prevention and to all first authors of articles cited in the text. The evaluation of each drug includes a discussion of its efficacy, side effects, and a comparison with older, more established agents. The final version of the paper includes comments from the reviewers and is checked and edited for accuracy and readability.

== Publisher ==
The journal is published by The Medical Letter, Inc., a nonprofit organization founded in 1958 by Arthur Kallet and Harold Aaron. It is independent of the pharmaceutical industry, supported by subscriptions, accepts no advertising, and has had a strict policy in place that in order to retain its objectivity, no reprints will be sold to the pharmaceutical industry.
