= Bowerstown, New Jersey =

Populated place in Warren County, New Jersey, US

- Unincorporated community
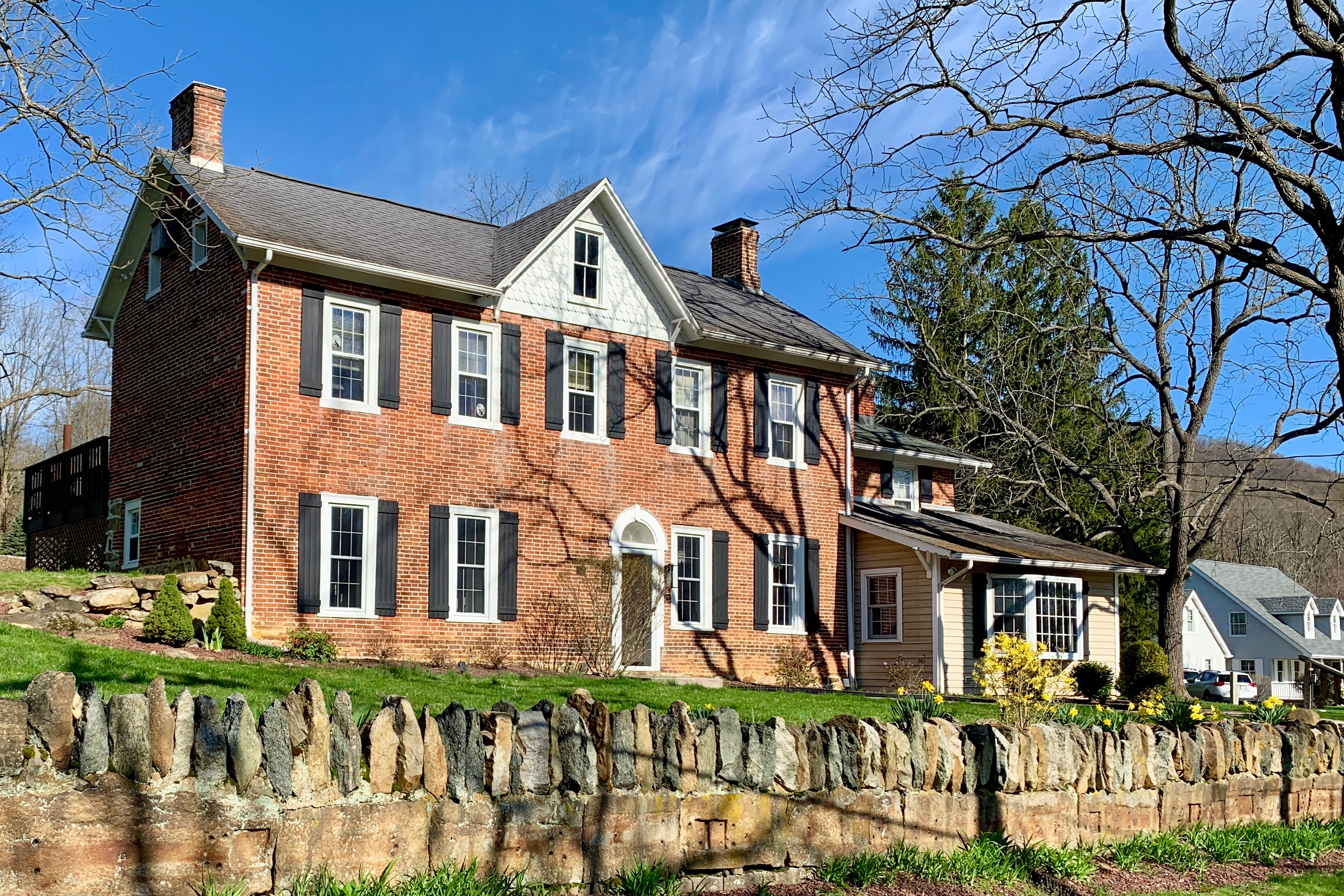
- Old Bowerstown Road

- Location within Warren County, New Jersey Location within New Jersey Location within the United States
- Coordinates: 40°46′18″N 74°59′56″W
- Country: United States
- State: New Jersey
- County: Warren
- Township: Washington
- Established: 1829
- Named for: Michael B. Bowers

Bowerstown is an unincorporated community in Washington Township, Warren County, New Jersey near the Morris Canal and the Pohatcong Creek. It was founded in 1829 by Jesse Vanetta and Michael B. Bowers with the building of an iron foundry. The Bowerstown Historic District, encompassing the village, was listed on the state and national registers of historic places in 1996.

== History ==
The iron foundry, built in 1829 by Jesse Vanetta and Michael B. Bowers, denotes the start of the community. It then developed around the Morris Canal, in particular, Inclined Plane 7 West and the boat basin by the Pohatcong Creek. In 1838, Peter Van Doren constructed a gristmill by the creek and the canal. Michael Bowers purchased the foundry in 1843 and concentrated on producing iron plows. The canal company built a house for the plane tender in the c. 1850s.

In 1933, Consumers' Research, at the recommendation of co-founder Frederick J. Schlink, moved from New York City to the Florey Piano Factory in nearby Washington, New Jersey. The company then built an office building, 1934–1935, and later a research laboratory, 1939–1940, on the Bowers Foundry property. The contributions of consumer advocate Mary Catherine Phillips, author of Skin Deep: The Truth About Beauty Aids – Safe and Harmful and member of the Board of Directors of Consumers' Research, is recognized here on the New Jersey Women's Heritage Trail. In 1986, the office building was bought by the Warren Hills Regional School District for use as district offices by the Board of Education.

== Historic district ==
- Bowerstown Historic District
- U.S. National Register of Historic Places
- U.S. Historic district
- New Jersey Register of Historic Places
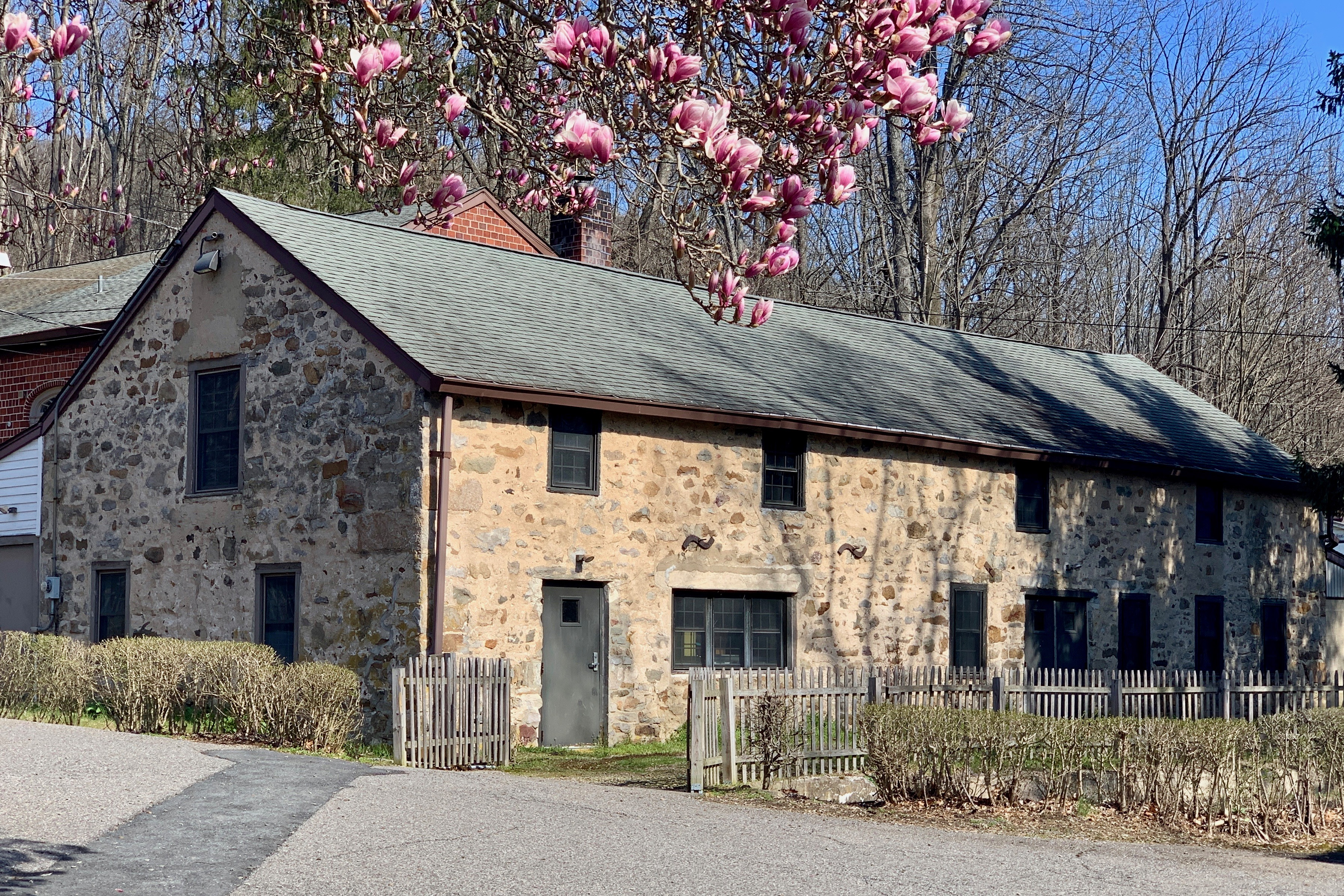
- Bowers Foundry, built c. 1829
- Location: Bowerstown, Plane Hill, Lannings Trail, and Mine Hill roads
- Coordinates: 40°46′22″N 74°59′54″W
- Area: 72 acres (29 ha)
- Architectural style: Mid 19th Century Revival, Colonial Revival, Greek Revival
- NRHP reference No.: 96000537
- NJRHP No.: 3503

Significant dates
- Added to NRHP: May 10, 1996
- Designated NJRHP: March 13, 1996

The Bowerstown Historic District is a historic district encompassing the village and bounded by Bowerstown, Plane Hill, Lannings Trail, and Mine Hill roads. The district was added to the National Register of Historic Places on May 10, 1996, for its significance in science, social history, communications, industry, architecture, and transportation from 1829 to 1945. It includes 42 contributing resources.

The Bowers Foundry, rubble stone, and the Consumers' Research office and laboratory buildings, both of Colonial Revival style, are at the center of the district. The two-story brick house on Old Bowerstown Road shows Federal influences with Victorian embellishment. The two-story brick house on Mine Hill Road has Greek Revival style, with Italianate influences.

After the Morris Canal was decommissioned in 1924, Washington Township purchased Inclined Plane 7 West and the aqueduct over the Pohatcong Creek to build Plane Hill Road. The plane tender's house also remains, but with modern additions on both sides. The retaining wall by the house on Old Bowerstown Road uses sleeper stones from the inclined plane as the base layer.

== Gallery ==
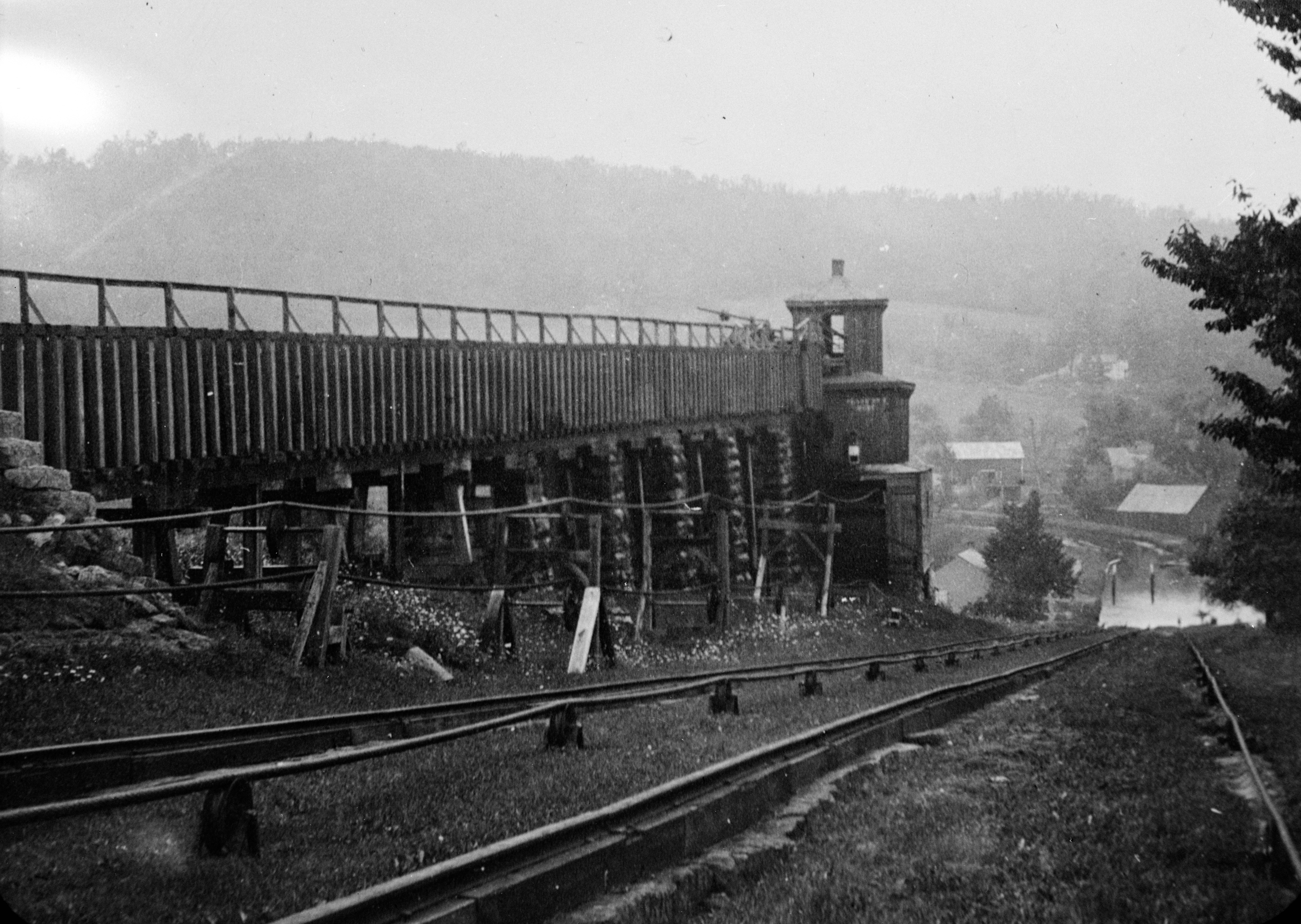
Historic view of Inclined Plane 7 West of the Morris Canal

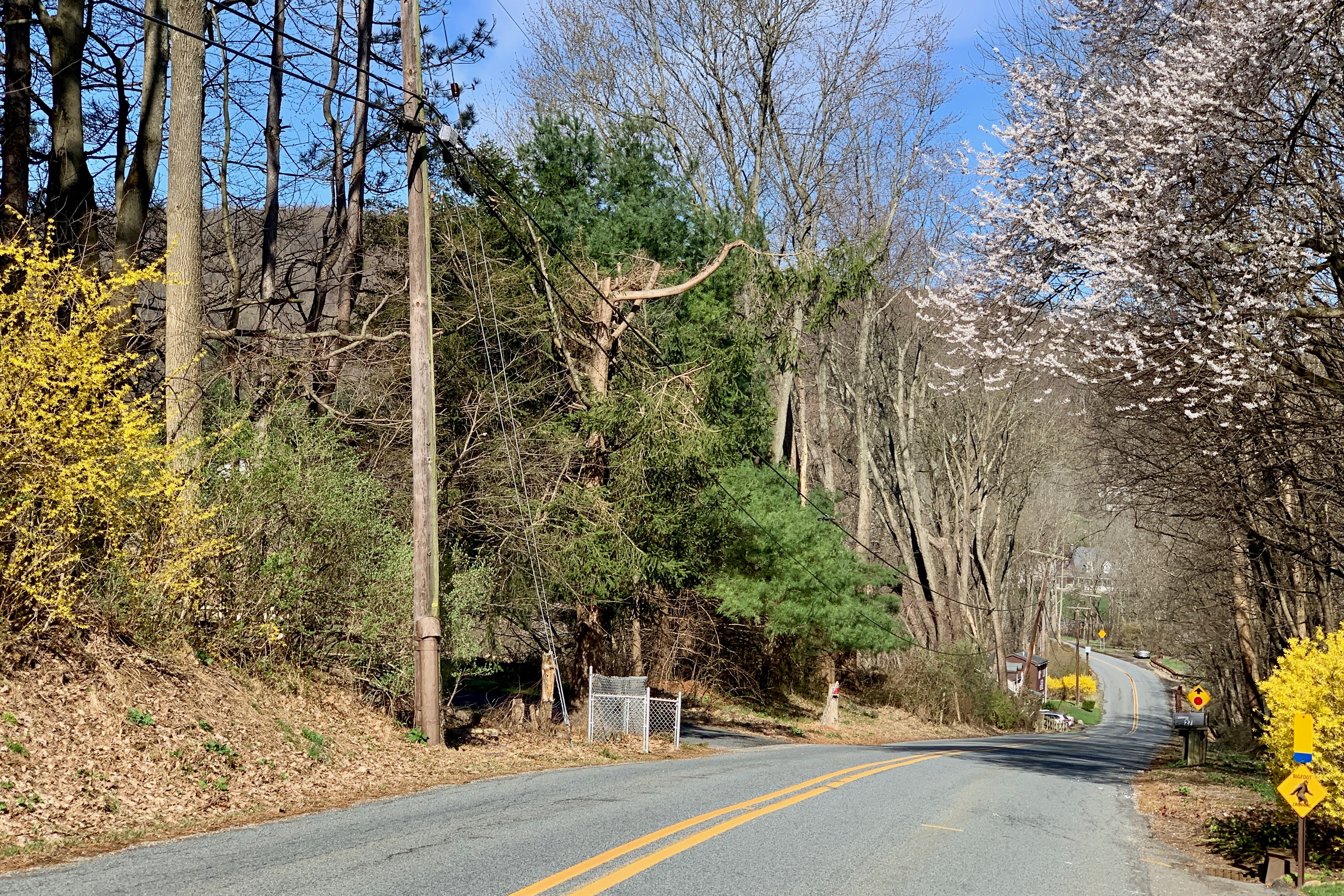
View of Morris Canal now, Plane Hill Road

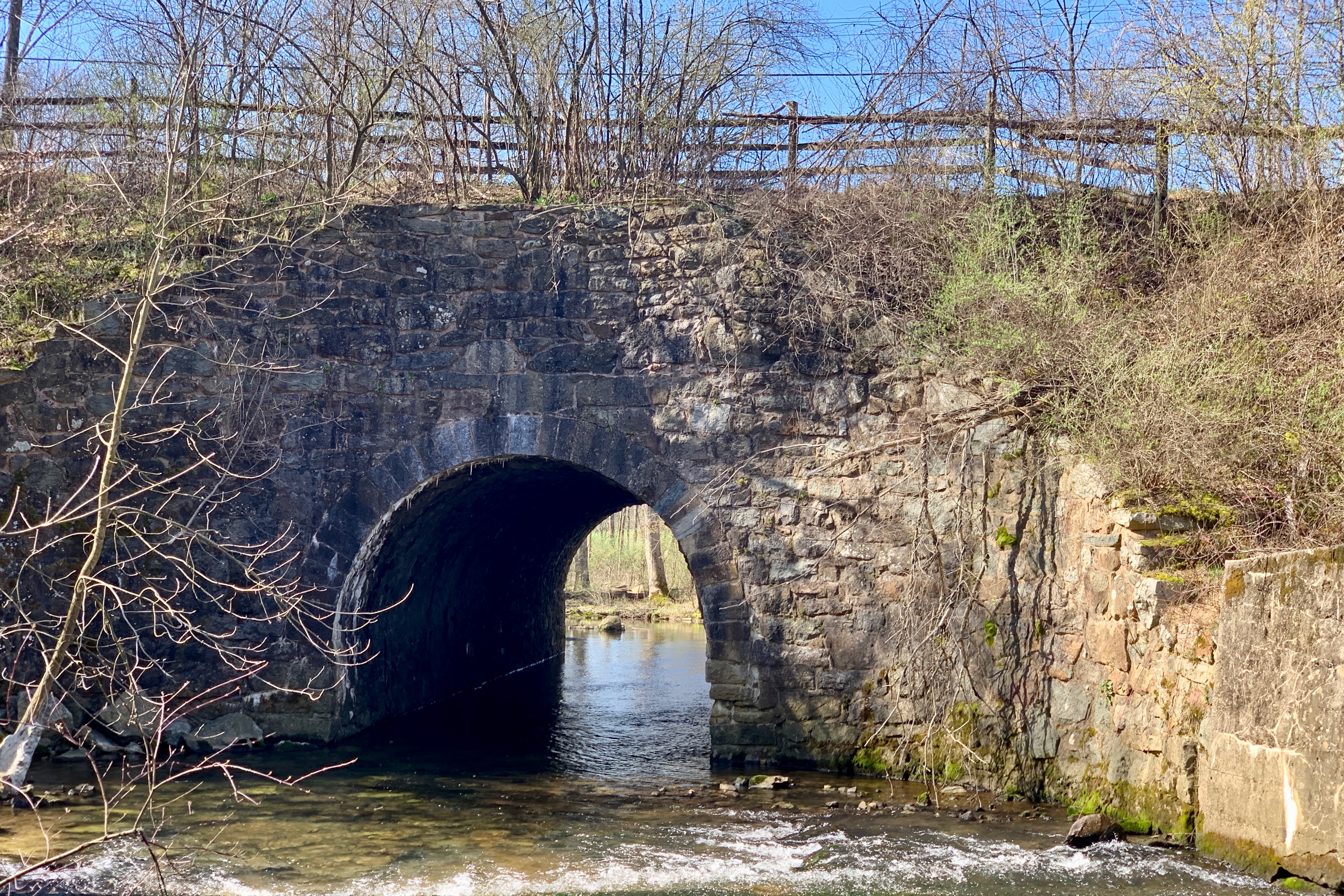
Morris Canal Aqueduct over the Pohatcong Creek, Plane Hill Road

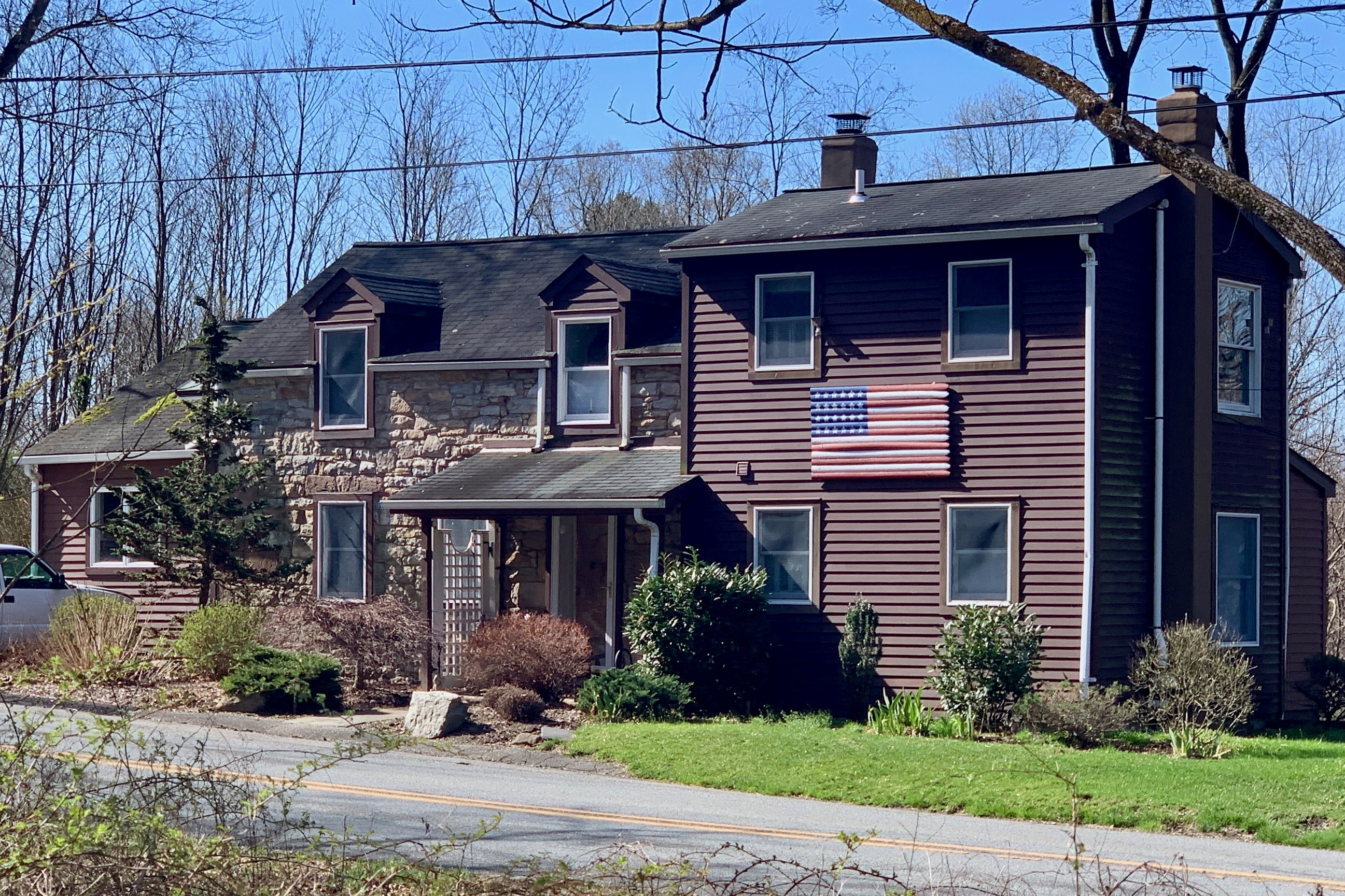
Plane tender's house, Plane Hill Road

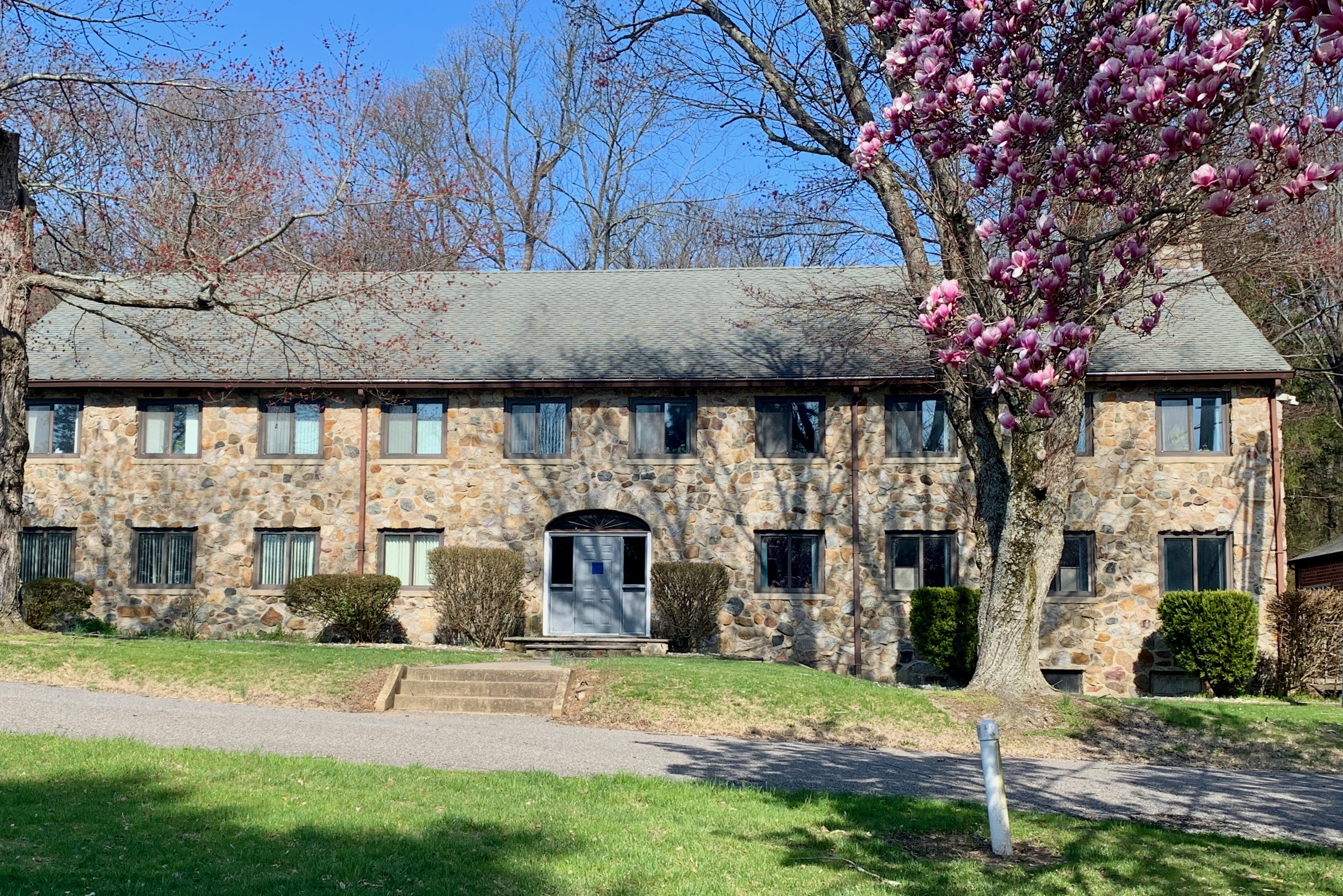
Consumers' Research offices, built 1934–35, Bowerstown Road

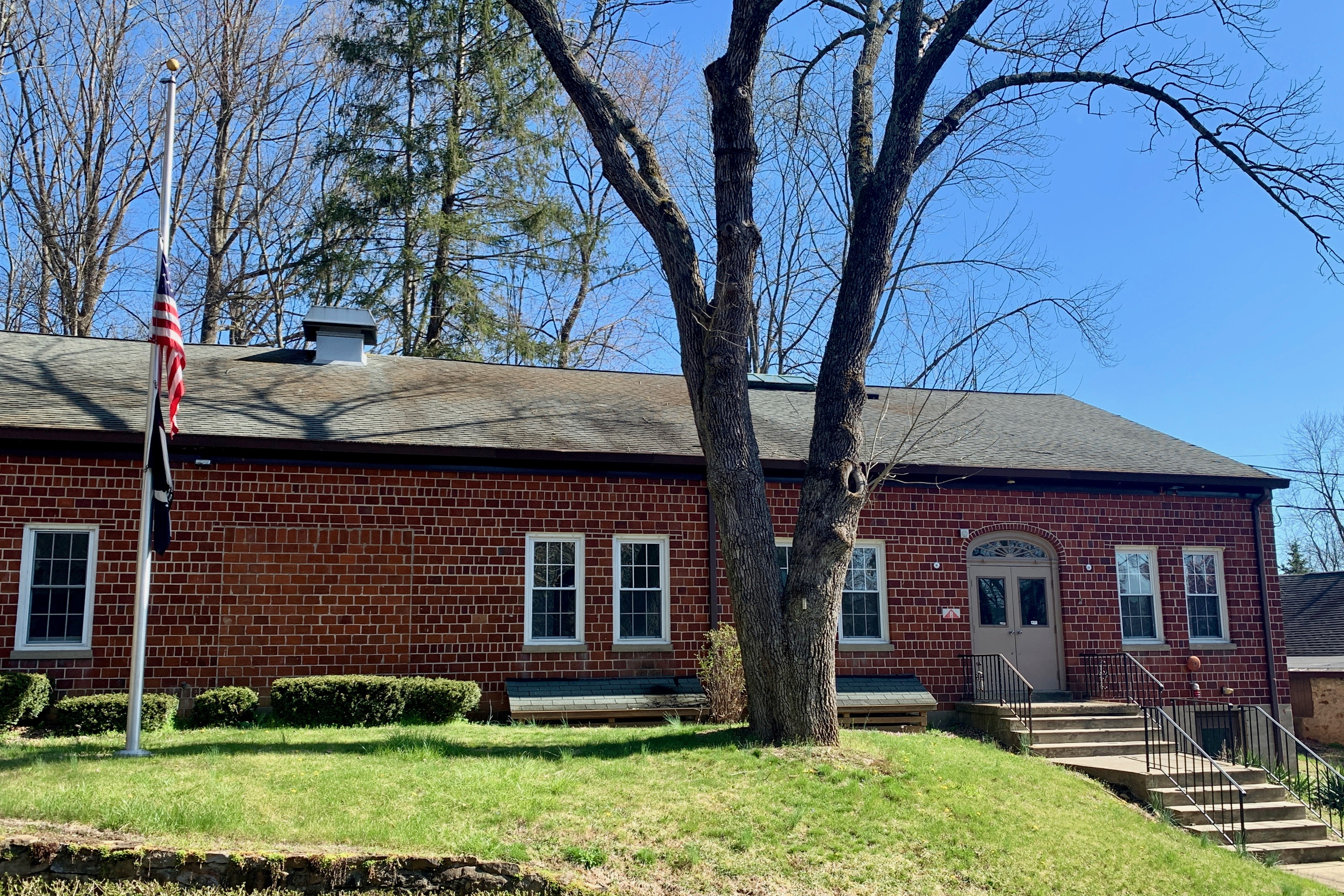
Consumers' Research laboratory, built 1939–40, Bowerstown Road

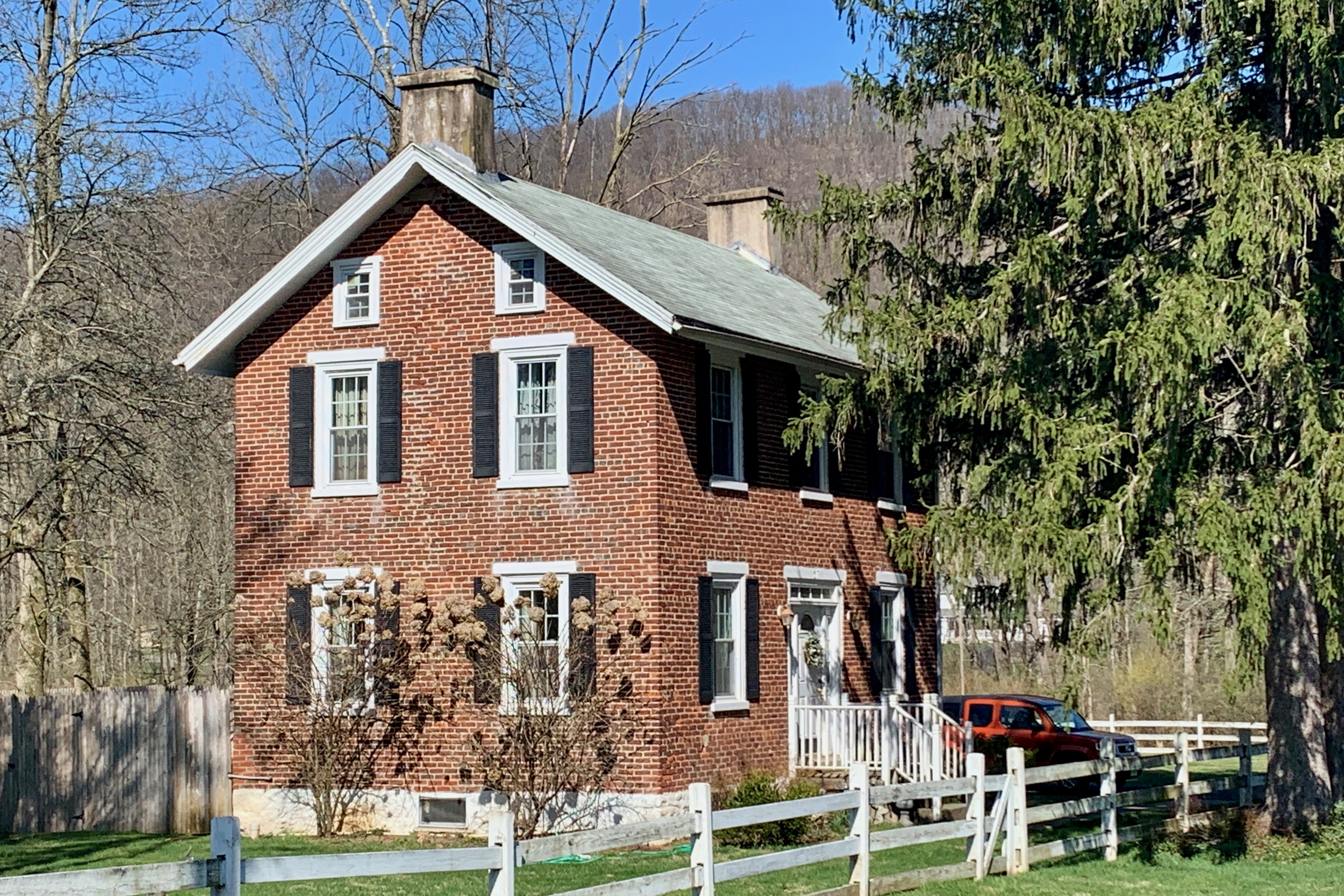
Greek Revival house, Mine Hill Road

== See also ==
- National Register of Historic Places listings in Warren County, New Jersey
- List of bridges on the National Register of Historic Places in New Jersey
- Port Colden Historic District
