= Buyers Laboratory Inc =

Buyers Laboratory (a division of Keypoint Intelligence) is a company which provides information on the imaging industry. It was founded in 1961 by the late Arthur Kallet, the co-founder and 20-year head of Consumers Union, the publisher of Consumer Reports magazine (BLI is not affiliated with Consumers Union). In February, 2004, BLI was acquired by publishing industry veterans Michael Danziger and Mark Lerch, who today remain as active advisors and members of the Board of Directors.

Buyers Laboratory serves original equipment manufacturers (OEMs), dealers, and business consumers, reporting on devices like printers, multifunctional devices, facsimile machines. scanners, wide-format devices and digital imaging software. Its products include field and laboratory test reports, bliQ, a database repository of information and tools such as comparisons, custom testing for OEMs and advice for business consumers.
