= List of The New York Times number-one books of 1935 =

This is a list of books that topped The New York Times best-seller list in 1935. When the list began in 1931 through 1941 it only reflected sales in the New York City area.

== Fiction ==
The following list ranks the number-one best-selling fiction books.

The two most popular books that year were Europa, by Robert Briffault, which held on top of the list for 9 weeks, and Of Time and the River by Thomas Wolfe, which was on top of the list for 7 weeks.

Date	Book	Author
January 7	The Forty Days of Musa Dagh	Franz Werfel
January 14	The Forty Days of Musa Dagh	Franz Werfel
January 21	Heaven's My Destination	Thornton Wilder
January 28	Heaven's My Destination	Thornton Wilder
February 4	Heaven's My Destination	Thornton Wilder
February 11	Heaven's My Destination	Thornton Wilder
February 18	The Forty Days of Musa Dagh	Franz Werfel
February 25	Heaven's My Destination	Thornton Wilder
March 4	Come and Get It	Edna Ferber
March 11	Come and Get It	Edna Ferber
March 18	Of Time and the River	Thomas Wolfe
March 25	Of Time and the River	Thomas Wolfe
April 1	Come and Get It	Edna Ferber
April 8	Of Time and the River	Thomas Wolfe
April 15	Of Time and the River	Thomas Wolfe
April 22	Of Time and the River	Thomas Wolfe
April 29	Green Light	Lloyd C. Douglas
May 6	Of Time and the River	Thomas Wolfe
May 13	Of Time and the River	Thomas Wolfe
May 20	Now in November	Josephine Johnson
May 27	Now in November	Josephine Johnson
June 3	Now in November	Josephine Johnson
June 10	Young Renny	Mazo De La Roche
June 17	Paths of Glory	Humphrey Cobb
June 24	Paths of Glory	Humphrey Cobb
July 1	Paths of Glory	Humphrey Cobb
July 8	Paths of Glory	Humphrey Cobb
July 15	Paths of Glory	Humphrey Cobb
July 22	Paths of Glory	Humphrey Cobb
July 29	Green Light	Lloyd C. Douglas
August 5	Green Light	Lloyd C. Douglas
August 12	Lucy Gayheart	Willa Cather
August 19	Lucy Gayheart	Willa Cather
August 26	Lucy Gayheart	Willa Cather
September 2	Lucy Gayheart	Willa Cather
September 9	Vein of Iron	Ellen Glasgow
September 16	Vein of Iron	Ellen Glasgow
September 23	Europa	Robert Briffault
September 30	Europa	Robert Briffault
October 7	Europa	Robert Briffault
October 14	Europa	Robert Briffault
October 21	Europa	Robert Briffault
October 28	Europa	Robert Briffault
November 4	It Can't Happen Here	Sinclair Lewis
November 11	Europa	Robert Briffault
November 18	Europa	Robert Briffault
November 25	Europa	Robert Briffault
December 2	It Can't Happen Here	Sinclair Lewis
December 9	It Can't Happen Here	Sinclair Lewis
December 16	It Can't Happen Here	Sinclair Lewis
December 23	It Can't Happen Here	Sinclair Lewis
December 30	It Can't Happen Here	Sinclair Lewis

== Nonfiction ==
The following list ranks the number-one best-selling nonfiction books.

Date	Book	Author
January 7	Experiment in Autobiography	H. G. Wells
January 14	While Rome Burns	Alexander Woollcott
January 21	While Rome Burns	Alexander Woollcott
January 28	Skin Deep	Mary Catherine Phillips
February 4	Skin Deep	Mary Catherine Phillips
February 11	While Rome Burns	Alexander Woollcott
February 18	While Rome Burns	Alexander Woollcott
February 25	While Rome Burns	Alexander Woollcott
March 4	Inflation Ahead!	Willard Kiplinger and Frederick Shelton
March 11	Francis the First	Francis Hackett
March 18	Francis the First	Francis Hackett
March 25	Francis the First	Francis Hackett
April 1	Francis the First	Francis Hackett
April 8	Francis the First	Francis Hackett
April 15	Francis the First	Francis Hackett
April 22	Personal History	Vincent Sheean
April 29	Culbertson's New Summary of Contract Bridge	Ely Culbertson
May 6	Culbertson's New Summary of Contract Bridge	Ely Culbertson
May 13	Road to War	Walter Millis
May 20	Handout	George Michael
May 27	Road to War	Walter Millis
June 3	Road to War	Walter Millis
June 10	Personal History	Vincent Sheean
June 17	Personal History	Vincent Sheean
June 24	Catherine	Gina Kaus
July 1	Personal History	Vincent Sheean
July 8	Personal History	Vincent Sheean
July 15	Personal History	Vincent Sheean
July 22	Catherine	Gina Kaus
July 29	Personal History	Vincent Sheean
August 5	Catherine	Gina Kaus
August 12	Don Fernando	Somerset Maugham
August 19	Life with Father	Clarence Day
August 26	North to the Orient	Anne Morrow Lindbergh
September 2	North to the Orient	Anne Morrow Lindbergh
September 9	North to the Orient	Anne Morrow Lindbergh
September 16	North to the Orient	Anne Morrow Lindbergh
September 23	North to the Orient	Anne Morrow Lindbergh
September 30	North to the Orient	Anne Morrow Lindbergh
October 7	North to the Orient	Anne Morrow Lindbergh
October 14	Seven Pillars of Wisdom	T. E. Lawrence
October 21	North to the Orient	Anne Morrow Lindbergh
October 28	Seven Pillars of Wisdom	T. E. Lawrence
November 4	North to the Orient	Anne Morrow Lindbergh
November 11	North to the Orient	Anne Morrow Lindbergh
November 18	North to the Orient	Anne Morrow Lindbergh
November 25	North to the Orient	Anne Morrow Lindbergh
December 2	North to the Orient	Anne Morrow Lindbergh
December 9	North to the Orient	Anne Morrow Lindbergh
December 16	North to the Orient	Anne Morrow Lindbergh
December 23	The Woollcott Reader	Alexander Woollcott, editor
December 30	The Woollcott Reader	Alexander Woollcott, editor

== See also ==
- Publishers Weekly list of bestselling novels in the United States in the 1930s
