= Federal Trade Commission Act of 1914 =

1914 US law establishing the Federal Trade Commission

Federal Trade Commission Act
- Long title: An Act To create a Federal Trade Commission, to define its powers and duties, and for other purposes.
- Enacted by: the 63rd United States Congress
- Effective: September 26, 1914

Legislative history
- Signed into law by President Woodrow Wilson on September 26, 1914

Major amendments
- Wheeler–Lea Act (1938)

The Federal Trade Commission Act of 1914 is a United States federal law which established the Federal Trade Commission. The Act was signed into law by US President Woodrow Wilson in 1914 and outlaws unfair methods of competition and unfair acts or practices that affect commerce.

== Background ==
The inspiration and motivation for this act started in 1890, when the Sherman Antitrust Act was passed. There was a strong antitrust movement to prevent manufacturers from joining price-fixing cartels. After Northern Securities Co. v. United States, a 1904 case that dismantled a J. P. Morgan company, antitrust enforcement became institutionalized. Soon, US President Theodore Roosevelt created the Bureau of Corporations, an agency that reported on the economy and businesses in the industry. The agency was the predecessor to the Federal Trade Commission.

In 1913, Congress expanded on the agency by passing the Federal Trade Commissions Act and the Clayton Antitrust Act. The Federal Trade Commission Act was designed for business reform. Congress passed the act in the hopes of protecting consumers against methods of deception in advertisement and of forcing the business to be upfront and truthful about items being sold.

The act was part of a bigger movement in the early 20th century to use special groups like commissions to regulate and oversee certain forms of business. The Federal Trade Commission Act works in conjunction with the Sherman Act and the Clayton Act. Any violations of the Sherman Act also violates the Federal Trade Commission Act and so the Federal Trade Commission can act on cases that violate either act. The Federal Trade Commission Act and both antitrust laws were created for the sole objective to "protect the process of competition for the benefit of consumers, making sure there are strong incentives for businesses to operate efficiently, keep prices down, and keep quality up." The acts are considered the core of antitrust laws and are still very important in today's society.

This commission was authorized to issue "cease and desist" orders to large corporations to curb unfair trade practices. In addition, the Federal Trade Commission Act is also considered a measure that protects privacy since it allows the FTC to penalize companies that violate their own policies by false advertising and other actions that can harm consumers. Some of the unfair methods of competition that were targeted include deceptive advertisements and pricing.

The act passed the Senate by a 43-5 vote on September 8, 1914 and the House on September 10 without a tally of yeas and nays. It was signed into law by President Wilson on September 26.

== Summary ==
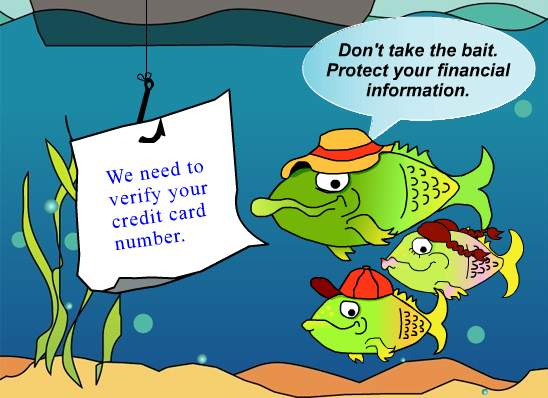
Frame of an animation by the Federal Trade Commission intended to educate citizens about phishing tactics

The Federal Trade Commission Act does more than create the Commission:

Under this Act, the Commission is empowered, among other things, to (a) prevent unfair methods of competition, and unfair or deceptive acts or practices in or affecting commerce; (b) seek monetary redress and other relief for conduct injurious to consumers; (c) prescribe trade regulation rules defining with specificity acts or practices that are unfair or deceptive, and establishing requirements designed to prevent such acts or practices; (d) conduct investigations relating to the organization, business, practices, and management of entities engaged in commerce; and (e) make reports and legislative recommendations to Congress.

The FTC Act prohibits unfair methods of competition, unfair or deceptive acts or practices in or affecting commerce. The Commission is empowered to enforce the act's provisions against all persons, partnerships or corporations, with several exceptions, including banks, savings and loans institutions, federal credit unions—each as described in the FTC Act. Banks, savings and loans institutions, federal credit unions and certain other financial entities are instead under the jurisdiction of the Consumer Financial Protection Bureau.

The Commission enforces the FTC Act through its federal rulemaking authority to issue industry-wide rules and regulations, adjudicatory powers, and statutory authority to file civil actions in certain circumstances. The FTC Act does not give consumers the right to sue for violations of the act, but consumers may complain to the Commission about acts or practices they believe to be unfair or deceptive. The Commission accepts and reviews petitions for rulemaking from the public. Consumers may, however, be authorized to sue under a state "UDAP" (unfair, deceptive and abusive practices) statute, sometimes called a "Little FTC Act."

=== Deception ===
An act or practice is "deceptive" under the FTC Act when there is a representation, omission or practice that is likely to mislead a consumer acting reasonably in the circumstances. The representation, omission or practice must also be material, in that it is likely to affect the consumer's conduct or decision regarding the product or service. If the representation or practice is directed to a particular group, the Commission will consider reasonableness from that targeted group's perspective. Notably, there is no requirement that the actor intend for their acts to be misleading. Deception is recognized as a form of anti-competitive conduct.

=== Unfairness ===
An act or practice is "unfair" under the FTC Act if it "causes or is likely to cause substantial injury" to consumers when the injury is "not reasonably avoidable by consumers themselves." Further, for an act or practice to be unfair, the injury cannot be outweighed by countervailing benefits to consumers or competition. An example of an injury that rises to the level of "substantial" for unfairness purposes would be the coercion of consumers into purchasing defective goods or services on credit without the ability to assert creditor claims or defenses against the transaction. Although public policy is not a specific criterion, it may be considered in determining how substantial an injury might be.

== Enforcement ==
=== Administrative adjudication ===
If after investigating, the Commission has reason to believe an actor has violated the FTC Act's prohibition on unfair methods of competition or unfair or deceptive acts or practices, and that a proceeding against the actor is in the public's best interest, the Commission is authorized to commence administrative proceedings against the actor in administrative court. Other parties may apply to intervene and appear at the hearing. If, after the administrative hearing, the Commission determines the actor has violated the FTC Act's prohibitions on unfair and deceptive acts, it must provide the actor with findings of fact and issue and serve a cease and desist order against the violation. The enjoined party may appeal the FTC's cease and desist order to the U.S. Court of Appeals in "any circuit where the method of competition or act or practice in question was used or where such person, partnership or corporation resides or carries on business . . . ."

=== Civil actions against parties subject to administrative cease and desist order ===
When a cease and desist order against a person's act or practice of unfair and deceptive practices becomes final, the Commission may then seek relief for the violation in either a U.S. district court or "in any competent jurisdiction of a State." If the court determines that the act or practice in question is "one in which a reasonable man would have known under the circumstances was dishonest or fraudulent," the court may grant relief that the "court finds necessary to redress injury to consumers or other persons, partnerships, and corporations" resulting from the violation or unfair or deceptive act or practice. The statute provides a non-exhaustive list of relief available, including rescission or reformation of contracts, refunds or returns of property, damages, or public notice of the violation.

In addition, if an actor subject to a cease and desist order violates the Commission's final and in-effect order to cease and desist engaging in an unfair or deceptive act or practice, the enjoined actor is automatically liable for a civil penalty up to $10,000 per violation, the amount of which is to be determined by a district court. In such circumstances, the FTC Act gives U.S. district courts the power to grant mandatory injunctions and "such other and further equitable relief as they deem appropriate" in order to enforce the Commission's final order.

=== Other civil actions ===
The Commission is also authorized to commence civil actions in a U.S. district court—without first adjudicating the matter in administrative court—against actors it finds to be in violation of the Commission's promulgated rules prohibiting deceptive and unfair practices. It may do so, however, only in certain circumstances, including if it determines that the actor had actual knowledge or "knowledge fairly implied on the basis of objective circumstances" that the act is unfair or deceptive.

If the Commission issued a final and in-effect cease and desist order through its administrative proceedings with regard to an unlawful act or practice, it may initiate civil proceedings against another actor for engaging in the same unlawful act or practice, even when the new actor was not subject to the initial cease and desist order. However, the Commission may do so only if the actor had engaged in the act or practice with "actual knowledge" that the act or practice was both "unfair or deceptive" and unlawful.

Actual knowledge can be established with a showing that the Commission provided the actor with a copy of its determination or a synopsis of such determination that led to the relevant cease and desist order. Both types of actions will result in an up to $10,000 civil penalty to be determined by the court.

The FTC Act also authorizes the Commission in particular cases to obtain a permanent injunction through a civil action in federal court against any actor under the Commission's jurisdiction if it believes the actor "is violating, or is about to violate, any provision of law" enforced by the Commission. The U.S. Supreme Court has determined that the provision providing the Commission with its power to seek a permanent injunction does not give it the extra power to seek an award of "equitable monetary relief such as restitution or disgorgement."
