= Wheeler–Lea Act =

- Long title: An Act to amend the Act creating the Federal Trade Commission, to define its powers and duties, and for other purposes
- Enacted by: the 75th United States Congress

Citations
- Public law: Pub. L. 75–447
- Statutes at Large: 52 Stat. 111

Codification
- Acts amended: Federal Trade Commission Act of 1914
- Titles amended: 15
- U.S.C. sections amended: 5

Legislative history
- Introduced in the Senate as S. 1077 by Burton K. Wheeler / Clarence F. Lea; Committee consideration by Senate Interstate Commerce; Passed the House on; Passed the Senate on; Signed into law by President Franklin D. Roosevelt on March 21, 1938

The Wheeler–Lea Act of 1938 is a United States federal law that amended Section 5 of the 1914 Federal Trade Commission Act to proscribe "unfair or deceptive acts or practices" as well as "unfair methods of competition." It provided civil penalties for violations of Section 5 orders. It also added a clause to Section 5 that stated "unfair or deceptive acts or practices in commerce are hereby declared unlawful" to the Section 5 prohibition of unfair methods of competition in order to protect consumers as well as competition.

Until this amendment was passed, the Federal Trade Commission could only restrict practices that were unfair to competitors. This broadened the FTC's powers to include protection for consumers from false advertising practices.
