= Stuart Chase =

American economist (1888–1985)

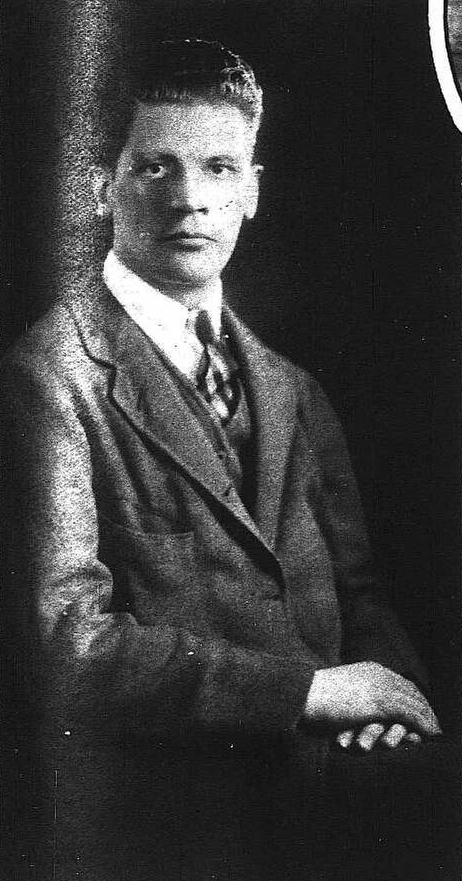
Chase c. 1929

Stuart Chase (March 8, 1888 – November 16, 1985) was an American economist, social theorist, and writer. His writings included topics as diverse as general semantics and physical economy. His thought was influenced by Henry George (1839–1897), by economic philosopher Thorstein Veblen (1857–1929), by Fabian socialism, and briefly by the Communist social and educational experiments in the Soviet Union to around 1930, though Chase was broadly a modern American liberal.

Chase spent his early political career endorsing "a wide range of reform causes: the single tax, women's suffrage, birth control and socialism." Chase's early books, The Tragedy of Waste (1925) and Your Money's Worth (1927), were notable for their criticism of corporate advertising and their advocacy of consumer protection. In 1929 Chase co-founded Consumers' Research, a consumer protection advocacy organization.

== Early life ==
Chase was born in Somersworth, New Hampshire, to public accountant Harvey Stuart Chase and Aaronette Rowe. His family had been living in New England since the 17th century. He attended the Massachusetts Institute of Technology from 1907 to 1908 and graduated from Harvard University in 1910 as a public accountant. After graduating, Chase became part of his father's accounting business in Boston.

Chase married Margaret Hatfield in 1914 and had two children, Sonia and Robert. He and Margaret were divorced in 1929, and one year later, he married Marian Tyler, a violinist and staff member at The Nation who collaborated with him on several of his books; she survived him by three and a half years.

== Career ==
In 1917, Chase quit accounting and took a position with the Food Administration of the Federal Trade Commission in Washington, D.C. In the commission, Chase performed investigations concerning waste and corruption, one of them being of the meat-packing industry with Upton Sinclair.

In 1921, Chase joined, along with economic philosopher Veblen, the Technical Alliance, which later became Technocracy Incorporated, part of the Technocracy movement. Chase also worked with the Labor Bureau, an organization that provided services for labor unions and cooperatives.

In 1927, Chase wrote Your Money's Worth, discussing advertisements that promise but fail to deliver products as advertised to customers who order them. In 1927, Chase traveled to the Soviet Union with members of the First American Trade Union Delegation and was the co-author of a book that praised Soviet experiments in agricultural and social management. In 1932, Chase wrote A New Deal, which became identified with the economic programs of American President Franklin Roosevelt. He also wrote a cover story in The New Republic, "A New Deal For America", which appeared days before Roosevelt promised "a new deal" in his speech accepting the presidential nomination of the Democratic Party. Whether Roosevelt speechwriter Samuel Rosenman got the phrase from Chase is unknown.

Chase's 1938 book The Tyranny of Words was an early and influential popularization of Alfred Korzybski's theory of general semantics.

Chase endorsed United States non-interventionism and was against U.S. entry in World War II, advocating this position in his 1939 book The New Western Front. After the war, Chase became involved with social science. In 1948, he published The Proper Study of Mankind in which he introduced the social sciences to several college campuses.

In a 1952 article, "Nineteen Propositions About Communism," Chase criticized the government of the USSR (dominated by Stalin), stating that its citizens, trade unions and farmers "had no power" despite the claims of Communist sympathizers. Chase also dismissed the Communist Party USA as "our minuscule menace" whose members consisted of "a high proportion of frustrated neurotics and plain crackpots as well as some high minded-idealists — a tragic group, this last."

Chase also quoted Herbert Philbrick (who had been encouraged by the FBI to infiltrate the Communist Party USA between 1940 and 1949) to the effect that "the McCarthyites and demagogues ... make the work of the FBI more difficult by confusing the innocent with the guilty."

In the 1960s, during the Presidency of Lyndon B. Johnson, Chase endorsed the Lyndon Johnson administration's Great Society policies.

Chase died in Redding, Connecticut.

== Quotations ==
Chase is famous for the rhetorical question at the end of his book A New Deal, "Why should the Soviets have all the fun remaking a world?" That was a reference to the "socialist experiment" in the USSR.

He is quoted in Hayakawa's Language in Thought and Action as having said, "Common sense is that which tells us the world is flat."

== Free Enterprise into "X" ==
On pages 95 and 96 of The Road We Are Traveling, with the heading of "Free Enterprise into 'X'", Chase listed 18 characteristics of political economy that he had observed among Russia, Germany, Italy, Japan, and Spain between 1913 and 1942. Chase labeled this phenomenon "... something called 'X'". Characteristics include the following:

1. A strong, centralized government.
2. An executive component growing at the expense of the legislative and judicial components.
3. The control of banking, credit and security exchanges by the government.
4. The underwriting of employment by the government, through armaments or public works.
5. The underwriting of social security by the government – old-age pensions, mothers' pensions, unemployment insurance, and the like.
6. The underwriting of food, housing, and medical care, by the government.
7. The use of deficit spending to finance these underwritings.
8. The abandonment of the gold standard in favor of managed currencies.
9. The control of foreign trade by the government.
10. The control of natural resources.
11. The control of energy sources.
12. The control of transportation.
13. The control of agricultural production.
14. The control of labor organizations.
15. The enlistment of young men and women in youth corps devoted to health, discipline, community service and ideologies consistent with those of the authorities.
16. Heavy taxation, with special emphasis on the estates and incomes of the rich.
17. Control of industry without ownership.
18. State control of communications and propaganda.

== Selected bibliography ==
- The Challenge of Waste 1922.
- Your Money's Worth: A study in the waste of the consumer's dollar (with Frederick J. Schlink). 1928
- Soviet Russia in the Second Decade – A Joint Survey by the Technical Staff of the First American Trade Union Delegation (with Rexford Tugwell). 1928
- The Tragedy of Waste. New York: The Macmillan Company. 1925 – via Internet Archive.
- Men and Machines 1929
- Prosperity Fact or Myth. Paper Books, NY 1929
- The Nemesis of American Business 1931
- Mexico – A Study of Two Americas 1931.
- A New Deal. New York: The Macmillan company. 1932. hdl:2027/uc1.$b666889 – via HathiTrust. OCLC 172909
- John Day pamphlet series 1932–34
  - vol. 2:Out of the Depression – and After: A Prophecy 1932.
  - vol. 19:Technocracy: An Interpretation 1933.
  - vol. 32:The Promise of Power 1933.
  - vol. 45:Move the Goods 1934.
- The Economy of Abundance. New York: The Macmillan company. 1934 – via HathiTrust.
- Rich Land, Poor Land 1936.
- The Tyranny of Words New York: Harcourt, Brace and Co, 1938. OCLC 822896
- The New Western Front (with Marian Tyler). Harcourt, Brace and Company, 1939.
- A Primer of Economics, 1941.
- A Generation of Industrial Peace: Thirty years of labor relations at Standard Oil Company 1941.
- When the war ends book series 1942–46, guide lines to America's future as reported to the Twentieth Century Fund by Stuart Chase
  - vol. 1: The Road We Are Traveling: 1914–1942 — Copyrighted in the United States until 2038 due to Renewal R189866
  - vol. 2: Goals for America: a budget of our needs and resources.
  - vol. 3: Where's the money coming from? Problems of postwar finance.
  - vol. 4: Democracy under pressure: special interests vs the public welfare.
  - vol. 5: Tomorrow's trade: problems of our foreign commerce.
  - vol. 6: For this we fought.
- The Proper Study of Mankind Harper & Brothers 1948. OCLC 615390630
- Roads to Agreement: Successful methods in the science of human relations 1951
- Danger – Men Talking! a Background Book on Semantics and Communication
- The Proper Study of Mankind Harper Colophon Books, 1956
- Guides to Straight Thinking, With 13 Common Fallacies. New York: Harper, 1956. OCLC 307334
- Live and Let Live: A Program for Americans 1959
- American Credos 1962

== Responses to Chase ==
- Vangermeersch, Richard G. J. The Life and Writings of Stuart Chase (1888–1985): From an Accountant's Perspective. Amsterdam: Elsevier JAI, 2005. ISBN 978-0-7623-1213-9

George Orwell mentioned Chase in his 1946 essay "Politics and the English Language". While discussing using language to express thought, Orwell mentions the claim by Chase and others that abstract words are meaningless, and their use of this claim as a pretext for advocating a kind of political quietism. He adds, "One need not swallow such absurdities as this, but one ought to recognise that the present political chaos is connected with the decay of language, and that one can probably bring about some improvement by starting at the verbal end. If you simplify your English, you are freed from the worst follies of orthodoxy. You cannot speak any of the necessary dialects, and when you make a stupid remark its stupidity will be obvious, even to yourself."

In 1969 President Richard Nixon cited Chase's work in a message to Congress about consumer protection.

== See also ==
- History of economic thought

== Sources ==
- Chase, Stuart (1942). The Road We Are Traveling. New York: The Twentieth Century Fund.
- Richard Wightman Fox, James T. Kloppenberg – A Companion to American Thought
