= 100,000,000 Guinea Pigs =

1933 book by Arthur Kallet and F. J. Schlink

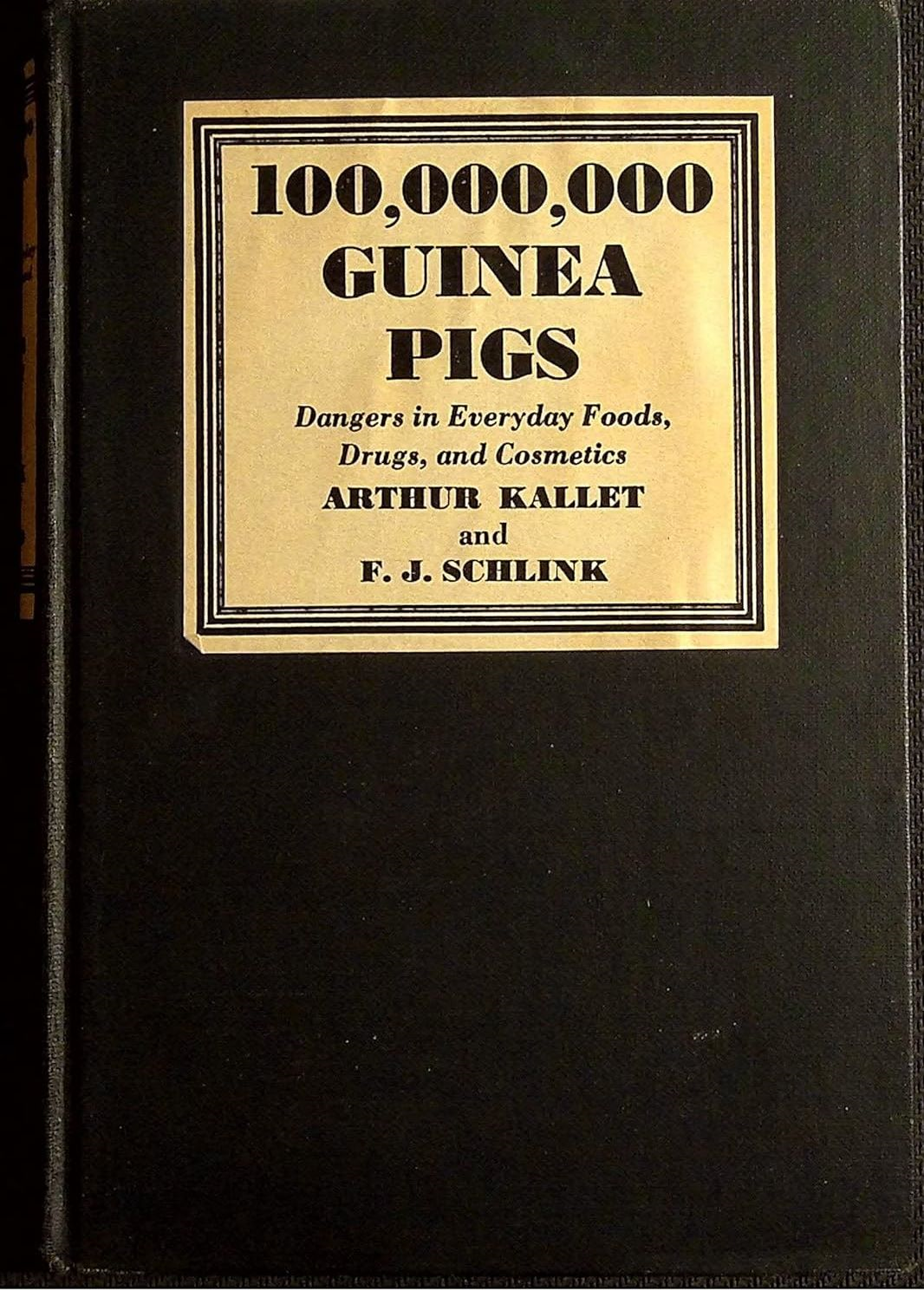
- First edition
- Author: Arthur Kallet and Frederick J. Schlink
- Subject: Consumer movement
- Published: 1933 (Vanguard Press); 1935 (Grosset & Dunlap)
- Publication place: United States

100,000,000 Guinea Pigs: Dangers in Everyday Foods, Drugs, and Cosmetics is a book written by Arthur Kallet and F. J. Schlink first released in 1933 by the Vanguard Press and manufactured in the United States of America. Its central argument propounds that the American population is being used as guinea pigs in a giant experiment undertaken by the American producers of food stuffs and patent medicines and the like. Kallet and Schlink premise the book as being "written in the interest of the consumer, who does not yet realize that he is being used as a guinea pig..."

== Summary ==
The book's key proposition is that a significant portion of the products sold to the public—particularly pharmaceuticals and food products—are released with little regard for or knowledge of how these products adversely affect the consumer. Corporations, often knowingly, release products which either do not do what they purport to do, or have dangerous side effects or defects. Furthermore, many officials and government departments, namely, the U.S. Food and Drug Administration, have fallen victim to regulatory capture.

The book goes on to state that the Pure Food and Drug Act of 1906 is not effective in arresting these trends, and real reform or consumer protection is obstructed by the powerful connections that offending corporations have with the government.

If the poison is such that it acts slowly and insidiously, perhaps over a long period of years (and several such will be considered in later chapters), then we poor consumers must be test animals all our lives; and when, in the end, the experiment kills us a year or ten years sooner than otherwise we would have died, no conclusions can be drawn and a hundred million others are available for further tests.

The authors develop ideas such as synergy effects, and the precautionary and substitution principles. They claim that many toxic substances, even in low concentrations, can act together to cause much more harmful effects than each substance would individually. Prolonged exposure to low amounts of toxic substances, even at very mild concentrations, can potentially have serious negative health impacts that consumers are not made aware of. These impacts are felt by all consumers because harmful substances are being ingested by consumers because of the use of dangerous pesticides, herbicides and other chemicals in food production. Preservatives are particularly criticized, and the increase in canned or packaged foods is cited as evidence of an increasing risk of such synergy effects because of the large amount of chemical byproducts these products include.

The book argues that many products would not be sold if properly labeled, and this failure to police product labeling has been a key failing of the Food and Drug Administration. Extensive reform and overhaul in government regulation and inspection of the food and drug industry is needed in order to adequately protect consumers from corporations and manufacturers who do not place the health of the consumer before profit. Examples cited include beauty products, which in the first quarter of the 20th century were found to contain arsenic, lead and even radium, the health effects of which were not understood or known to consumers at the time. The true label for a pineapple pie, they argue, would be closer to this:

Corn starch-filled, glucose-sweetened pie with made with sub-standard canned pineapple, artificial (citric acid) lemon flavor and artificial coal tar color.

The book takes particular aim at the pharmaceutical market in the United States during the period, citing extensive lists of drugs which are often the subject of very strong and widespread campaigns of media promotion as "wonder-drugs," yet which do not have any effect on the conditions they purport to cure, and often carry with them serious side effects that are not revealed to consumers. The authors claim that advertising for these drugs is deliberately misleading and uses a variety of dishonest techniques from false testimonials to fake experts. The authors also question the value of statements made by scientists who vouch for the safety of products, citing the example of a dean of the College of Pharmacy of Columbia University who had vouched for the safety of a drug that later proved fatal to many.

In the final analysis, the authors encourage consumers to be more active and questioning in their purchasing habits. Consumers should be vigilant in finding out more information about products and ingredients, and boycotting producers and their products that contain dangerous ingredients. They also call for stronger laws, tougher penalties for offending companies, and a much more concerted effort from authorities to implement consumer protection laws. The book concludes with the statement that "Above all, let your voice be heard loudly and often, in protest against indifference, ignorance, and avarice responsible for the uncontrolled adulteration and misrepresentation of foods, drugs, and cosmetics."

== Reception ==
The book proved to be extremely popular and a national bestseller in the years immediately following its release, and at least 13 printings of the book were published in the first six months of publication. Public reaction to the book was very strong. Many people were shocked at the extent of food contamination and drug side-effects, and 100,000,000 Guinea Pigs, along with several other books of a similar nature, were published during a period when a new consumer movement emerged. It is often cited, along with American Chamber of Horrors by Ruth deForest Lamb, as being one of the key catalysts for increased government regulation over food and drugs in the United States which led to the passage in 1938 of the Federal Food, Drug, and Cosmetic Act.

The book was also the subject of strong opposition from several quarters—not just vested interests such as the drug companies, but also from the medical fraternity. The book was frequently criticized for being sensational propaganda, and many at the time questioned the credentials of the authors (both engineers) and the accuracy of the claims. Several professionals in the medical industry also pointed to the unscientific and spurious conclusions reached, with one commenting on "data fantastically exploited and erroneously interpreted," "extreme and unrealistic conclusion[s]" and "authors with technical qualifications more pronounced in the art of sensationalism than [in] the sciences of biology, chemistry, or public health."

Today, many of the authors' scientific conclusions are indeed thought to have been mistaken. For example, they claimed that bran (roughage) has many negative effects on the intestine, which contradicts today's view that bran in moderation is beneficial to the intestines.

However, it still remains an influential book on the topic of consumer affairs. Nearly forty years later, in 1972, John G. Fuller published his expose of the food, drug and cosmetic industries, honoring Kallet and Schlink by entitling his book 200,000,000 Guinea Pigs: New Dangers in Everyday Foods, Drugs and Cosmetics. In the Introduction, Fuller wrote, "Today, nearly forty years later, the situation is worse, not better. ... Time bombs are ticking away in several dark corners. ... It is 1933 all over again—multiplied by logarithms. The difference is only a matter of form."

== Bibliography ==
- Kallet, Arthur; Schlink, Frederick John (1933). 100,000,000 Guinea Pigs; Dangers in Everyday Foods, Drugs, and Cosmetics. Vanguard Press.
