= Arthur Kallet =

- Born: December 15, 1902; Syracuse, New York, U.S.
- Died: February 24, 1972 (aged 69); New Rochelle, New York, U.S.

Arthur Kallet (December 15, 1902 – February 24, 1972) was an American consumer advocate.

== Career ==
An engineer, Kallet co-authored a 1933 book entitled 100,000,000 Guinea Pigs: Dangers in Everyday Foods, Drugs and Cosmetics with fellow engineer Frederick Schlink.

In 1936 he left as director of Consumers' Research after its head, F.J. Schlink, fired three striking employees who had tried to form a union, and joined with Amherst College professor Colston Warne to found Consumers Union and Consumer Reports.

The House Un-American Activities Committee cited Arthur Kallet as the communist head of Consumers Union, which it cited as a communist front.

In 1957, Kallet broke with Warne and left Consumers Union to form The Medical Letter on Drugs and Therapeutics, and in 1961, Buyers Laboratory Inc.
