= Your Money's Worth =

Book by Stuart Chase

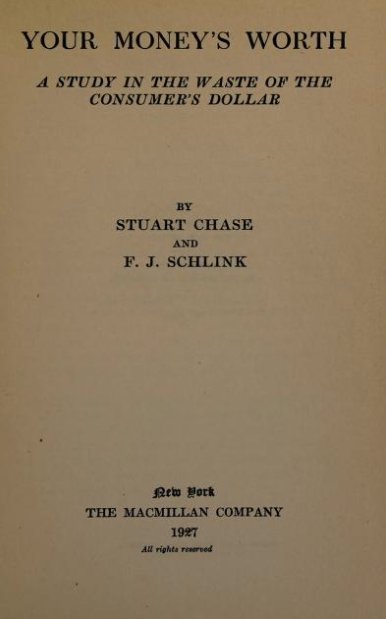
- Title page for Your Money's Worth: A study in the waste of the consumer's dollar (1927)
- Author: Stuart Chase and Frederick J. Schlink
- Original title: Your Money's Worth: A study in the waste of the consumer's dollar
- Subject: consumerism
- Genre: nonfiction
- Publication date: 1927
- Publication place: United States

Your Money's Worth: A study in the waste of the consumer's dollar is a 1927 nonfiction book on consumerism written by Stuart Chase and Frederick J. Schlink. It is notable for becoming popular enough to initiate a consumer protection movement. Soon after publication, its authors founded Consumers' Research, the organization that employed the founders of Consumers Union/Consumer Reports.

The book was a protest against marketing practices that made it difficult for consumers to be able to judge the value of products. It analyzed the ways in which Americans made purchase decisions and gave measurements of the extent to which products could serve the purpose that manufacturer claims stated that they could.

The authors requested an "extension of the principle of buying goods according to impartial scientific tests rather than according to the fanfare and trumpets of the higher salesmanship."

In retrospect, a book reviewer in 1937 said that before the book was published that discussions about the consumer only happened in the context of women's magazines, home economics, or by unorthodox economists like Simon Patten, Thorstein Veblen, or Wesley Clair Mitchell.

== Summary ==
At the time of research, the authors found that the United States published 11,000 product specifications to guide manufacturing and that private industries had developed many more. These specifications covered a wide range of products including “foodstuffs, soaps, metal polishes, hooks and eyes, motorboat engines … and so on indefinitely.” Despite the specifications existing, the authors claimed that manufacturers did not follow safety specifications and additionally were more interested in selling products than meeting the needs of consumers. The authors assert that market forces alone are not producing a market that serves consumers' best interests.

Your Money’s Worth argued that marketers of products used unfair practices in order to illegitimately coerce consumers. These practices included outright fraud in misrepresenting the quality and utility of products in advertising, promoting high-pressure sales practices, adding non-functional styling for deceptive purposes, and engineering products for planned obsolescence. The book also critiqued product differentiation on superficial grounds such as when various manufacturers sell nearly identical products but with different advertising and branding because this practice drives sales to benefit the marketer without also equally increasing value to consumers. Also, the book complains of lack of standardization, such as when sewing machines require highly specific parts unique to each brand when the parts could have been designed to be universal.

Your Money’s Worth recommended that the public be skeptical about advertising claims, make some products at home, support the government in setting product standards, and support the creation of impartial testing research centers.

== Reception ==
The book’s release resulted in the publisher receiving hundreds of letters from people requesting more information about consumer products. Within months, Your Money’s Worth became a best seller and a featured book in the Book of the Month Club.

Schlink and Chase, encouraged by the public response, solicited financial, editorial, and technical support from patrons of other activist magazines to found a new organization called Consumers' Research from roots in an existing White Plains, New York local consumer club.
