= Frederick J. Schlink =

American consumer rights activist (1891–1995)

- Born: October 26, 1891; Peoria, Illinois, US
- Died: January 15, 1995 (aged 103)
- Occupation: American consumer rights activist
- Known for: Consumers' Research

Frederick J. Schlink (October 26, 1891 – January 15, 1995) was an American consumer rights activist. He co-wrote the books Your Money's Worth with Stuart Chase and 100,000,000 Guinea Pigs with Arthur Kallet. He also co-founded the watchdog group Consumers' Research, which tried to both protect consumers from predatory sales tactics and educate people about consuming.

== Life and activism ==
Schlink was born in Peoria, Illinois, and graduated from the University of Illinois in 1912. In 1914, he acquired the degree of Mechanical Engineer, and worked at the United States Bureau of Standards until 1919. After working in quality control for Firestone Tire and Rubber Company, and for the Bell Telephone Laboratories, he became an assistant secretary for the non-profit American Standards Association.

In 1927, Schlink was co-author, with Stuart Chase, of the bestsellerYour Money's Worth, a book that asked for consumer goods to be required to meet a specific set of specifications. Schlink and Chase wanted businesses to focus their advertising on factual detail rather than misleading statements. Schlink and Chase claimed that misleading sales tactics led to inefficiency in the market, and they wanted the government to set product standards. They called for consumers to rely on scientific tests of a product's quality "rather than according to the fanfare and trumpets of the higher salesmanship." This call led to the formation of the group Consumers' Research. The book has been called the "Uncle Tom's Cabin of the consumer movement."

Arthur Kallet, the secretary of the group, enlisted Schlink's aid as co-author of One Hundred Million Guinea Pigs in 1933. (The title referred to what was roughly the population of the United States at the time.) The book caused a stir, noting that some well-advertised products (including mouthwash and hair dyes) were sometimes useless and even dangerous. In 1934, he published a pamphlet with his wife, Mary Catherine Phillips, Discovering Consumers. His final book was Eat, Drink and be Wary in 1935.

Schlink himself lived for sixty years after the book's publication and died at the age of 103 in Phillipsburg, NJ.

== Consumers' Research ==
In Your Money's Worth, Schlink and Chase described a market where consumers were being manipulated without them knowing, and the country was being robbed of the true potential of mass production and consumption. Both Schlink and Chase said that they had the expertise that was needed to make accurate evaluations on the quality of a product. The hundreds of letters Schlink and Chase received from concerned consumers after the publication of their book encouraged them to turn Schlink's small consumer club into Consumers' Research Inc. The bulletin they created cost $2 annually and became well known all over the United States.

The bulletin advised consumers in three different ways. They tested products and gave them a "recommended", "intermediate" or "not recommended" label. The testing was based on their own research and the opinions of experts. To avoid getting sued by the producers of reviewed products, Consumers' Research advised its readers to "treat most of the information regarding branded products as confidential". They also reported news of interest to consumers. For example, they reported on research done by other institutions on the deceptive nature of advertising. Consumers' Research advised its readers on how to effectively protect themselves as consumers by organizing.

Consumer Research also made an effort to effect legislation. In 1932 they were one of two organizations that opposed the Capper-Kelly Bill. It also called for the creation of a Department of the Consumer. Overall, Consumers' Research was part of a movement that grew in the early 1930s which wanted to make the consumer more politically active and powerful.

By the mid-1930s Consumers' Research had grown from 5,000 members to 45,000, aided largely by the success of the product recommendations in their bulletin. They staffed around 50 but had a consultant list of 200.Schlink was instrumental in moving Consumers' Research to Washington, New Jersey and then the Bowerstown section of Washington Township, New Jersey. When employees demanded more wages, he refused. Three went on strike with outside union help, and were terminated. Forty more employees then struck in support of those terminated.

Schlink had always been focused on capitalistic advertising, and he saw this as an "unholy alliance" with the strikers, and he used force to break the strike. This act was one that started the exodus of former CR employees to their own organization, the new Consumers Union, which began publishing its own magazine, Consumers Union Reports, in direct competition with Schlink's Consumers' Research Bulletin. This magazine soon surpassed the Bulletin in circulation, and, renamed Consumer Reports, became and remains the leading North American consumer magazine.
