= Middletown Township, New Jersey =

Township in Monmouth County, New Jersey

- Township
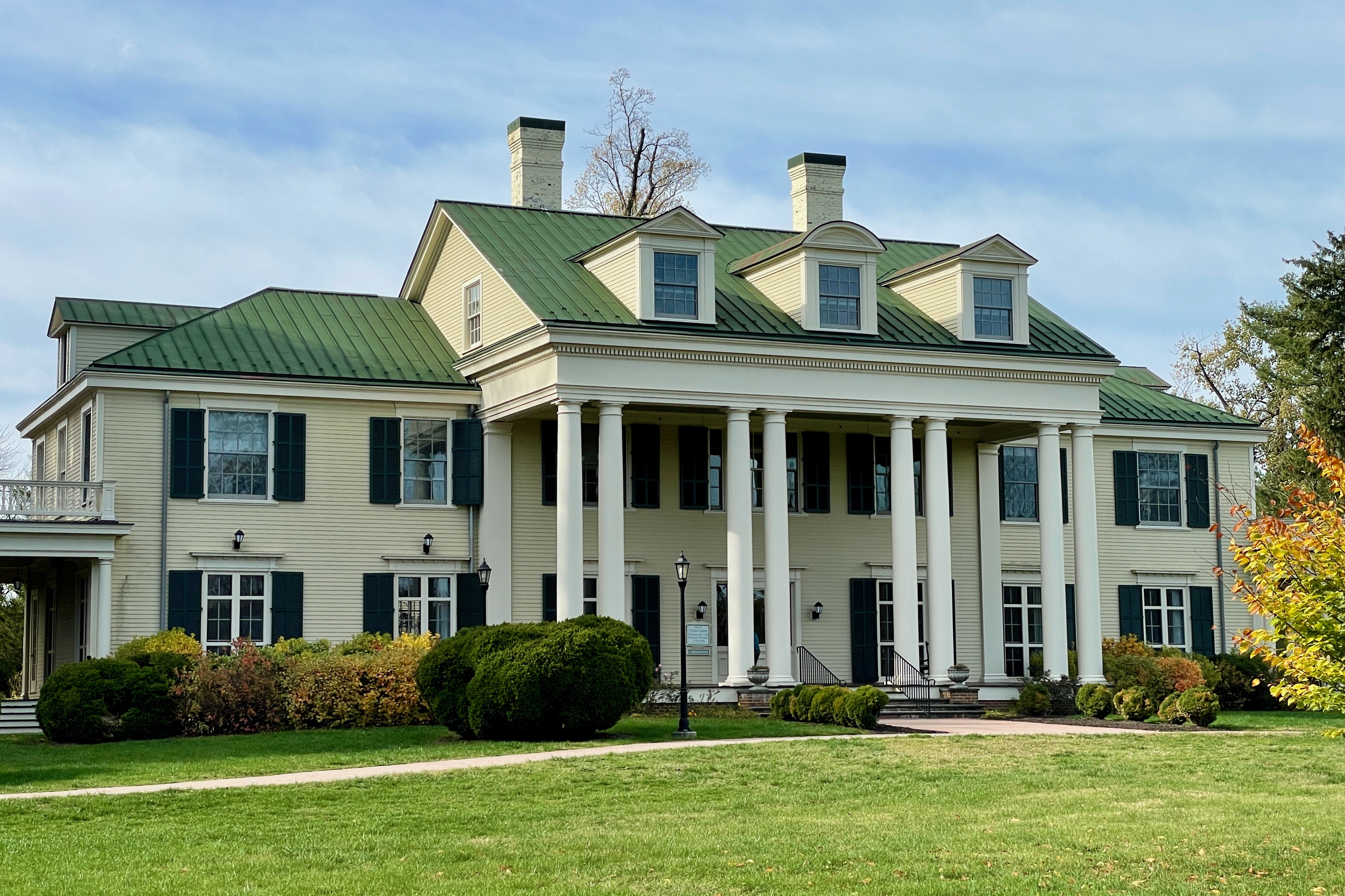
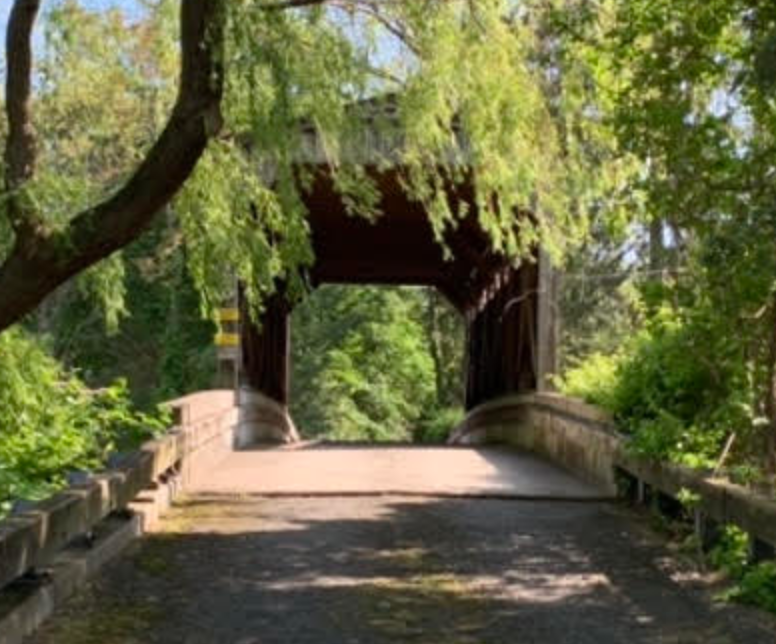
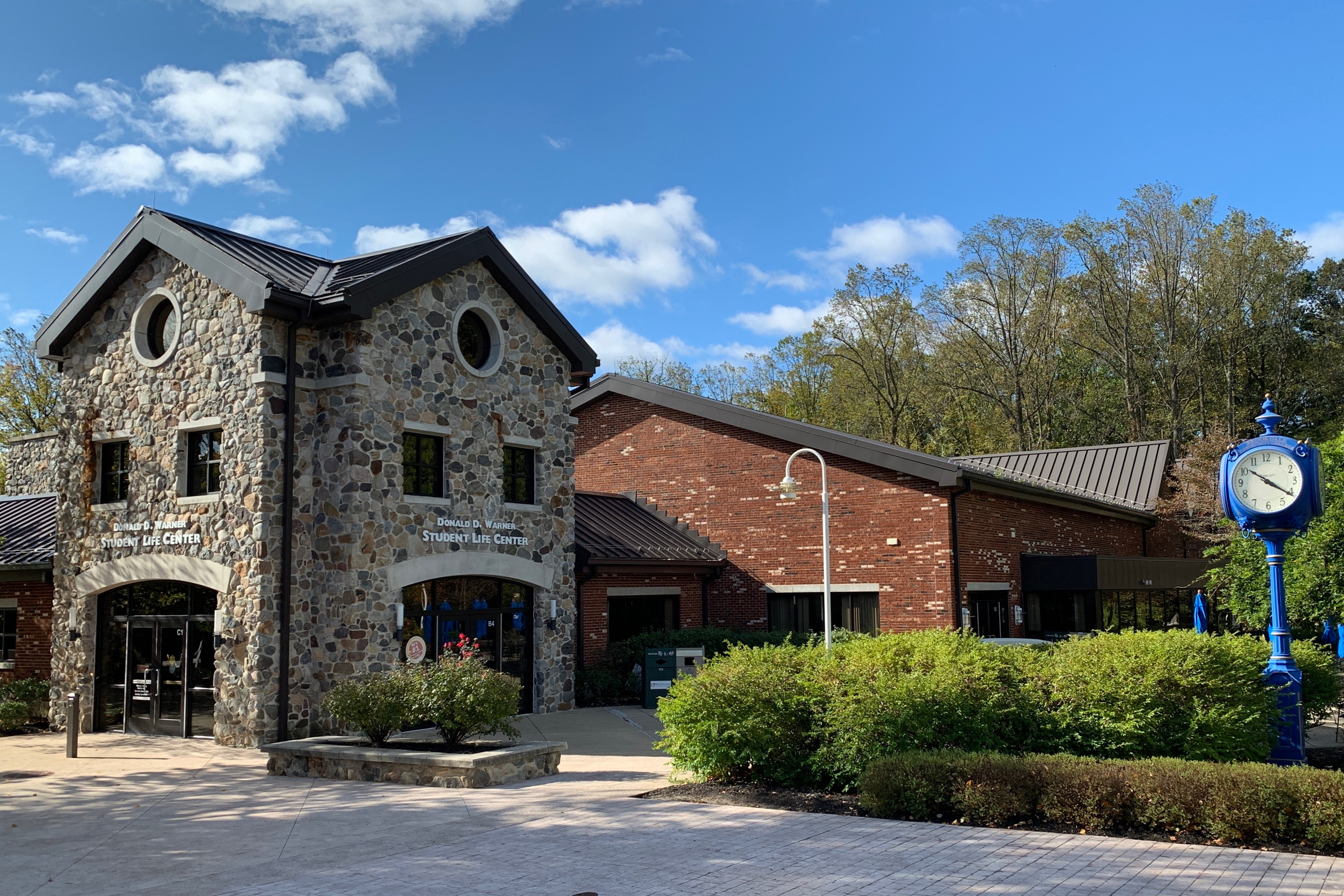
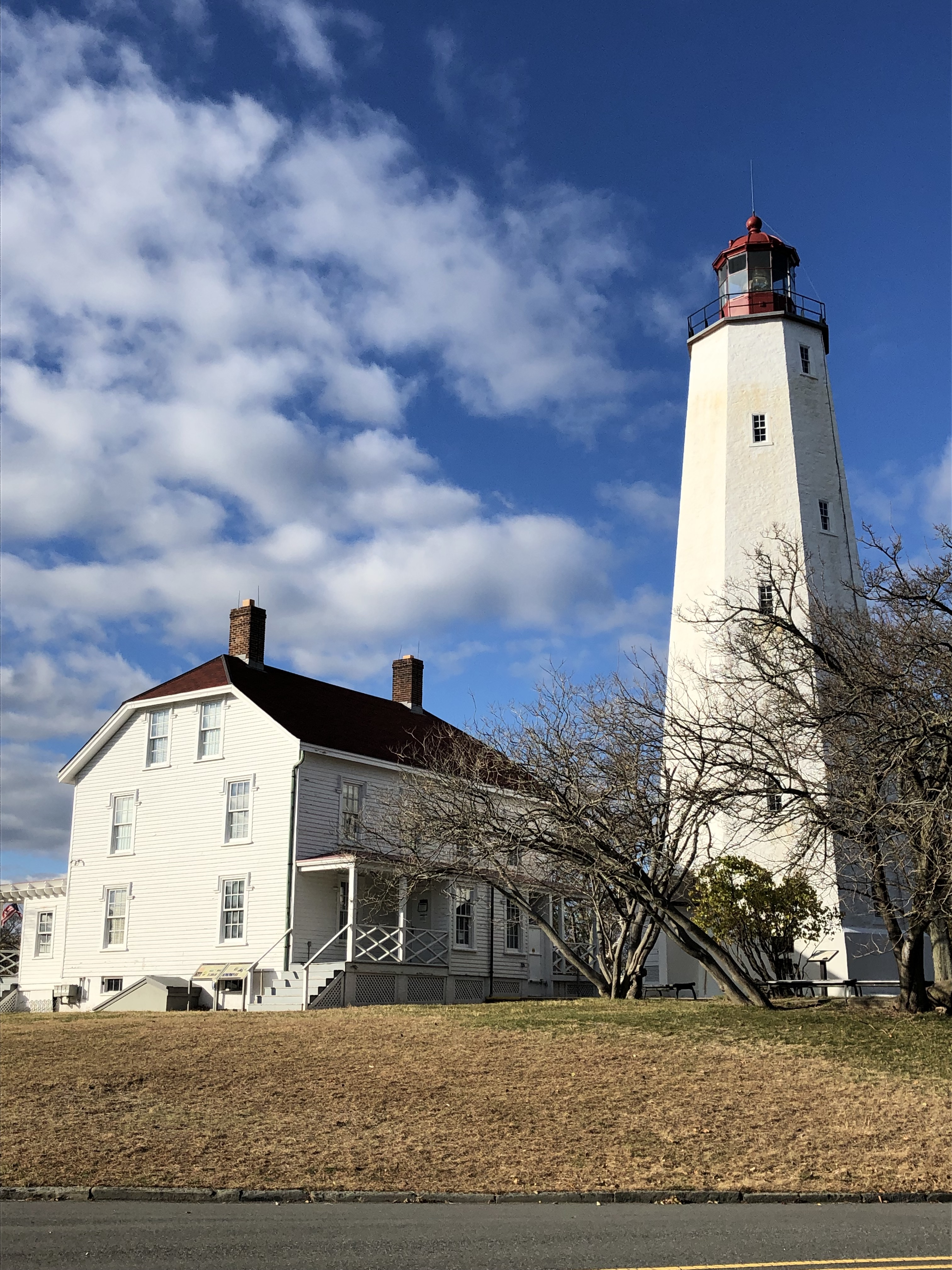
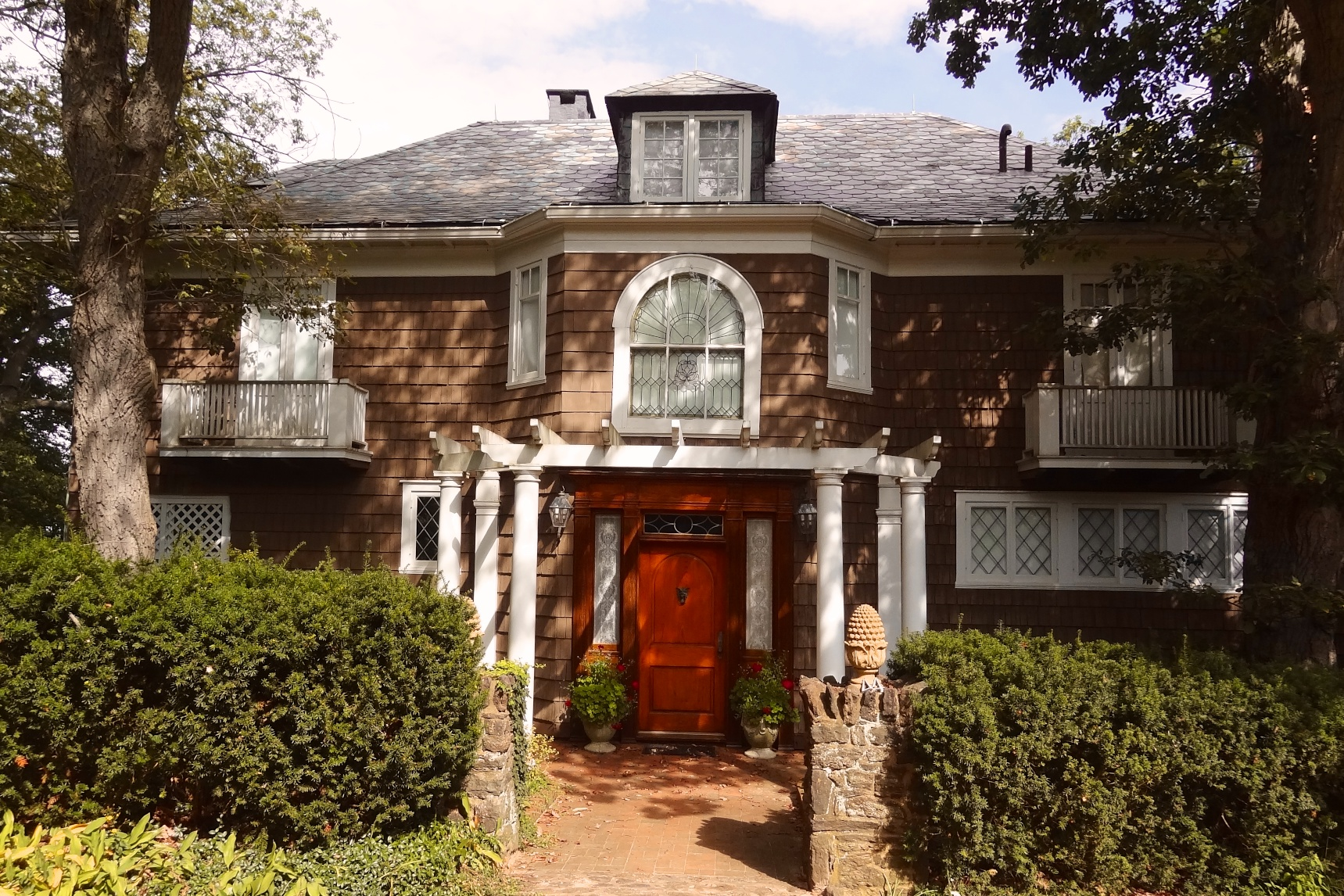
- From top, left to right: The former residence of American social reformer Geraldine Morgan Thompson, which now serves as the visitor center at Thompson Park in Middletown's Lincroft neighborhood, Covered bridge in Middletown Village, Brookdale Community College, Sandy Hook Light, and Water Witch homestead

- Seal
- Motto: The Biggest Small Town in New Jersey
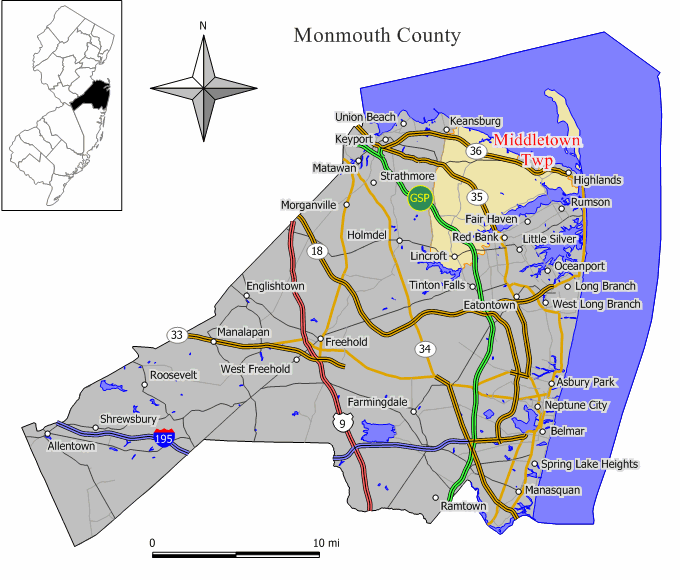
- Map of Middletown Township in Monmouth County. Inset (left): Monmouth County highlighted within New Jersey

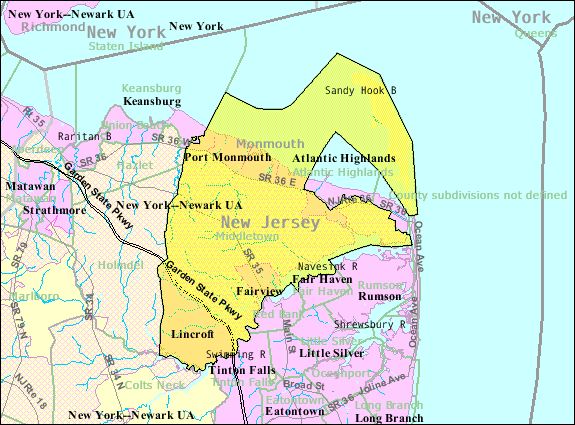
- Census Bureau map of Middletown Township, New Jersey
- Interactive map of Middletown Township, New Jersey
- Location in Monmouth County Location in New Jersey Location in the United States
- Coordinates: 40.404786°N 74.071404°W
- Country: United States
- State: New Jersey
- County: Monmouth
- Formed: October 31, 1693
- Incorporated: February 21, 1798

Government
  - Type: Special charter
  - Body: Township Committee
  - Mayor: Anthony S. Perry Jr. (R, term ends December 31, 2025)
  - Administrator: Anthony P. Mercantante
  - Municipal clerk: Heidi R. Pieluc

Area
  - Total: 58.72 sq mi (152.09 km^{2})
  - Land: 40.95 sq mi (106.06 km^{2})
  - Water: 17.78 sq mi (46.04 km^{2}) 30.27%
  - Rank: 23rd of 565 in state 2nd of 53 in county
- Elevation: 98 ft (30 m)

Population (2020)
  - Total: 67,106
  - Estimate (2025): 67,135
  - Rank: 20th of 565 in state 1st of 53 in county
  - Density: 1,638.8/sq mi (632.7/km^{2})
  - Rank: 326th of 565 in state 40th of 53 in county
- Time zone: UTC−05:00 (Eastern (EST))
  - Summer (DST): UTC−04:00 (Eastern (EDT))
- ZIP Codes: 07748 – Middletown; 07701 – Red Bank; 07716 – Atlantic Highlands; 07718 – Belford; 07732 – Highlands; 07733 – Holmdel; 07737 – Leonardo; 07738 – Lincroft; 07752 – Navesink; 07758 – Port Monmouth; 07760 – Locust
- Area codes: 732 and 908
- FIPS code: 3402545990
- GNIS feature ID: 0882604
- Website: middletownnj.org

Middletown Township is a township in northern Monmouth County, in the U.S. state of New Jersey. As of the 2020 United States census, the township was the state's 20th-most-populous municipality and the largest in the county, with a population of 67,106, an increase of 584 (+0.9%) from the 2010 census count of 66,522, which in turn reflected an increase of 195 residents (0.3%) from its population of 66,327 at the 2000 census, when it was the state's 17th-most-populous municipality.

Middletown is a bedroom community of New York City, located alongside of the Raritan Bay within the Raritan Valley Region in the New York area. Due to its affluence, low crime, access to cultural activities, public school system, location at the Jersey Shore and Raritan Bayshore, and central commuting location, Middletown was ranked in 2006, 2008, 2010, and 2014 in the Top 100 in CNNMoney.com's Best Places to Live. Time magazine listed Middletown on its list of "Best Places to Live 2014".

In 2016, SafeWise named Middletown Township as the fifth-safest city in America to raise a child; the township was the highest ranked of the 12 communities in New Jersey included on the list.

== History ==
Small communities of the Lenape Navesink tribe were common throughout the area when the first known European landing in what would become Middletown Township occurred in 1609. Sea captain and explorer Henry Hudson, in search of the mythical Northwest Passage in the service of the Dutch West India Company, anchored along the shores of Sandy Hook Bay in 1609, describing the area "a very good land to fall in with and a pleasant land to see." While a patroonship was granted by the company in 1651 the land wasn't officially settled. Today's Shoal Harbor Museum and Old Spy House includes portions of a house constructed by Thomas Whitlock, one of the area's first European settlers (and a Reformed Baptist at Middletown) who arrived here as early as 1664, around the time of the English takeover of New Netherland as a prelude of the Second Anglo-Dutch War. Long-standing tradition had Penelope Stout, one of the first settlers, hiding in a tree from hostile Native Americans.

Shortly after the Dutch surrender of the New Netherland to the English in 1664 a large tract of land known as the Navesink Patent or Monmouth Tract was granted to Baptist and Quaker settlers from Long Island, Rhode Island, and Massachusetts. In 1693 the triangular tract became three townships – Middletown Township, Shrewsbury Township and Freehold Township.

During the American Revolutionary War, Middletown and much of the rest of Eastern Monmouth County was held by the British. After the Battle of Monmouth, the British retreat from Freehold Township carried them down King's Highway through Middletown to their embarkation points at Sandy Hook in the bay, heading back to New York City.

Middletown Township was originally formed on October 31, 1693, and was incorporated as a township by the Township Act of 1798 of the New Jersey Legislature on February 21, 1798. Portions of the township were taken to form Atlantic Township (February 8, 1847, now Colts Neck Township), Raritan Township (February 25, 1848, now Hazlet), Atlantic Highlands (February 28, 1887), Highlands (March 22, 1900) and Keansburg (March 22, 1917).

Upon the completion of a railroad junction in 1875, the town grew more rapidly, eventually changing from a group of small and loosely connected fishing and agricultural villages into a fast-growing suburb at the turn of the 20th century. If Middletown ever had a recognizable town center or town square, it was lost in that rapid growth soon after World War II.

In May 1958, several Nike Ajax missiles exploded at Battery NY-53 in Chapel Hill, killing ten Army and civilian personnel. The accident was one of the worst missile-related disasters of the Cold War.

During the September 11 terrorist attacks in 2001, Middletown lost 37 of its residents at the World Trade Center, which was the second-most 9/11 deaths of any municipality, behind New York City itself. The World Trade Center Memorial Gardens were opened to the public on September 11, 2003, the second anniversary of the attacks.

The Waterfront site of Naval Weapons Station Earle is located in Leonardo on Sandy Hook Bay, and is used to load ammunition onto ships on a finger pier that stretches for 2.9 miles (4.7 km), making it the world's second-longest such pier.

The "Evil Clown of Middletown" is a towering sign along Route 35 painted to resemble a circus clown, that currently advertises a liquor store. The sign is a remnant of an old supermarket that used to be at that location called "Food Circus". The clown and recent successful attempts from residents to save it from demolition have been featured in the pages of Weird NJ magazine, on The Tonight Show with Jay Leno, and in the Kevin Smith-directed film Clerks II.

The Indian Trails 15K road race was held each year in April to benefit the Monmouth Conservation Foundation and included a 5K walk/run event for fun. The race, run on a combination on paved and dirt roads, included many relatively steep hills and had been described as "the most challenging race in the state".

The Middletown Township Historical Society is a non-profit formed in 1968 to preserve and promote the history of Middletown.

=== Gallery ===
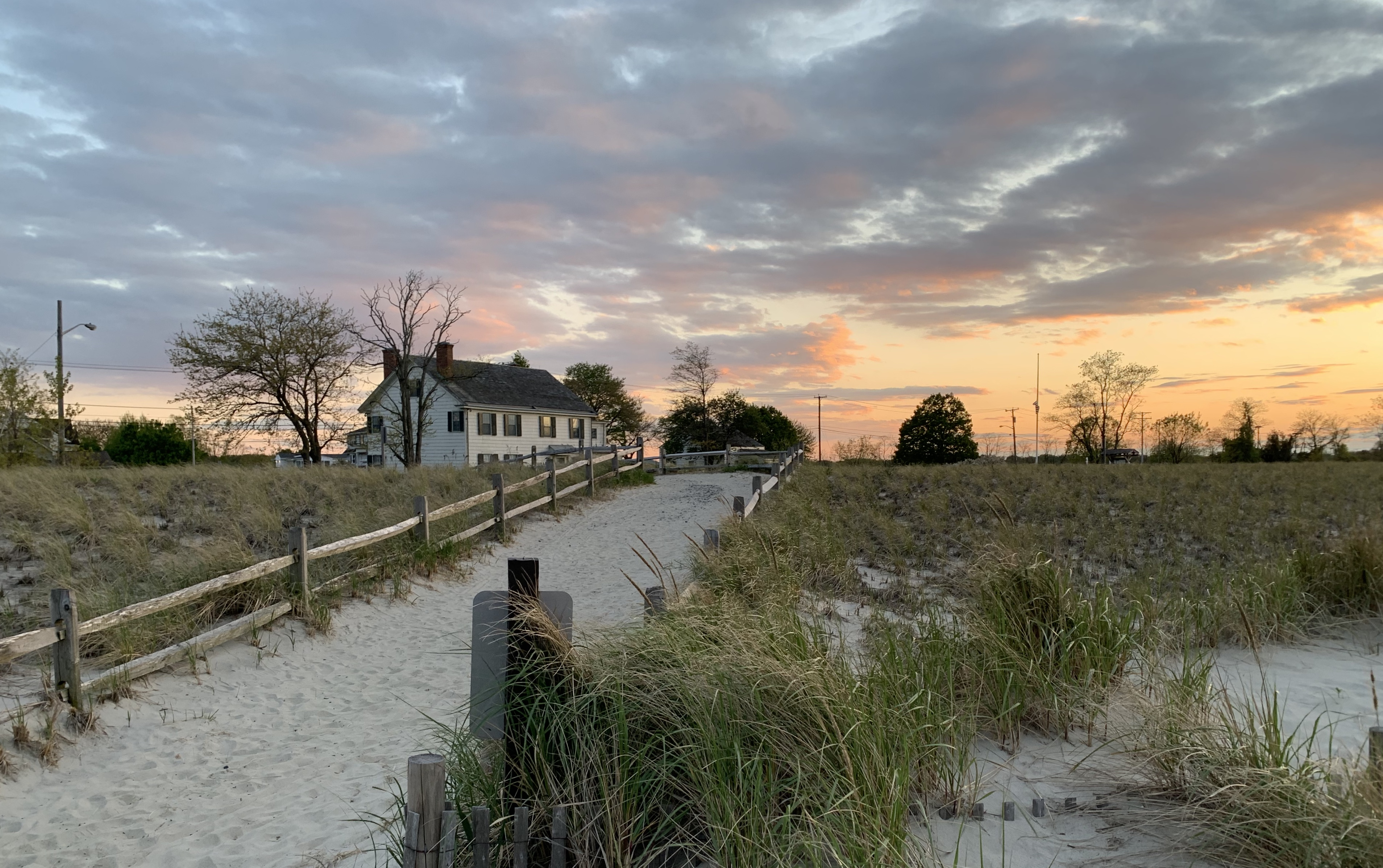
The Seabrook-Wilson House was built in 1663 and is one of the oldest surviving structures in New Jersey

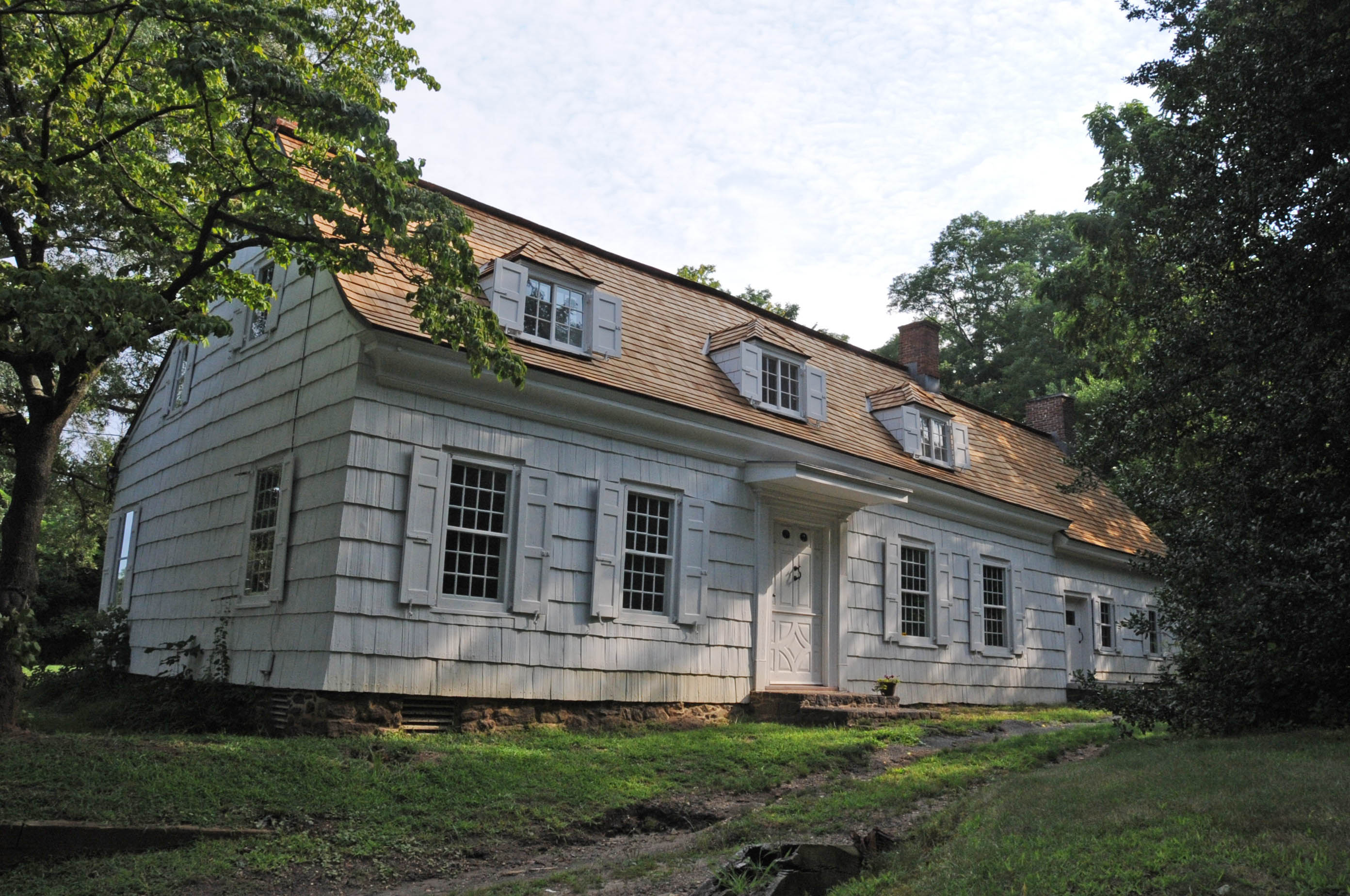
Marlpit Hall was built in 1686 and is an example of New England-influenced saltbox architecture

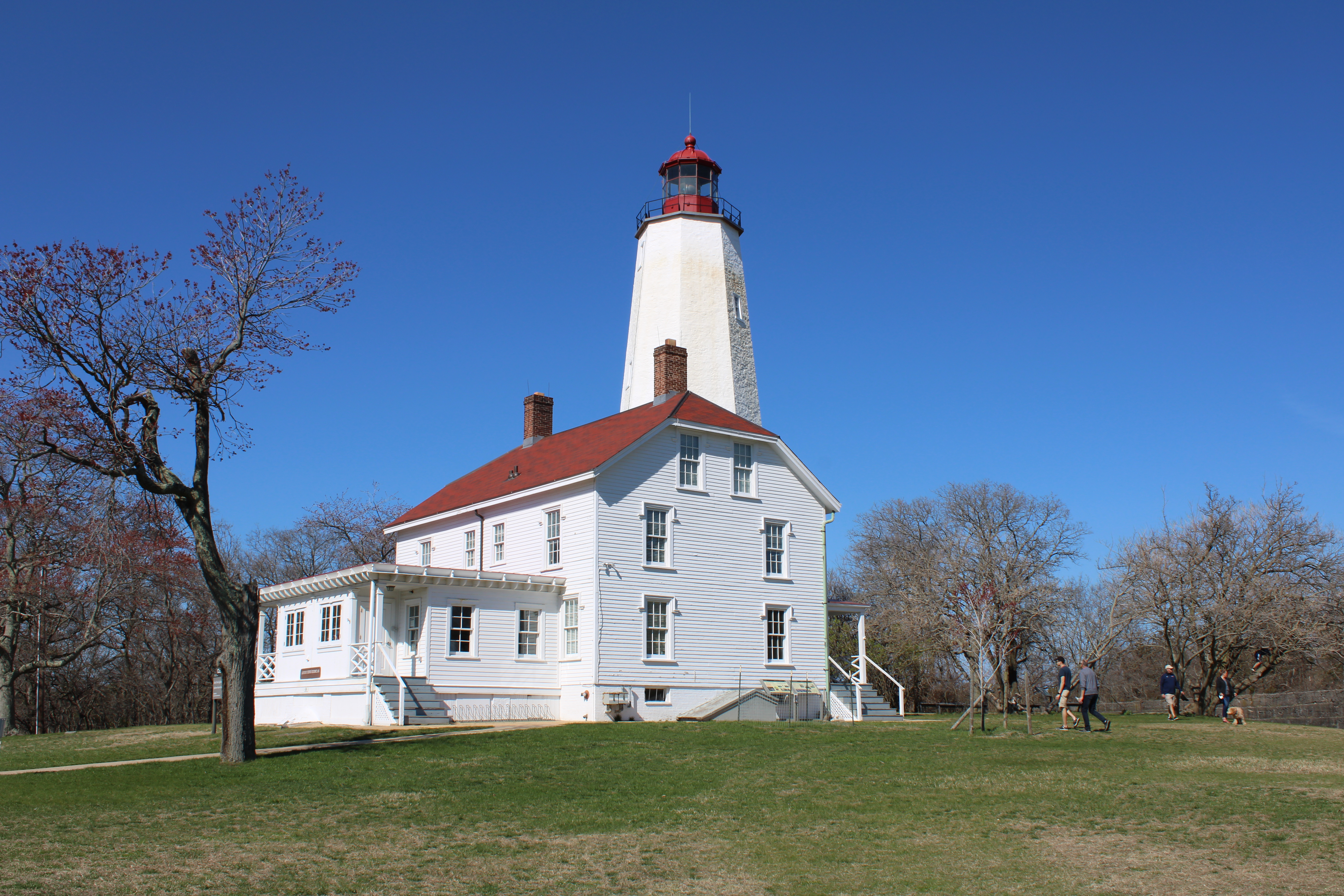
Sandy Hook Light was built in 1764. It is the oldest operating lighthouse in the United States

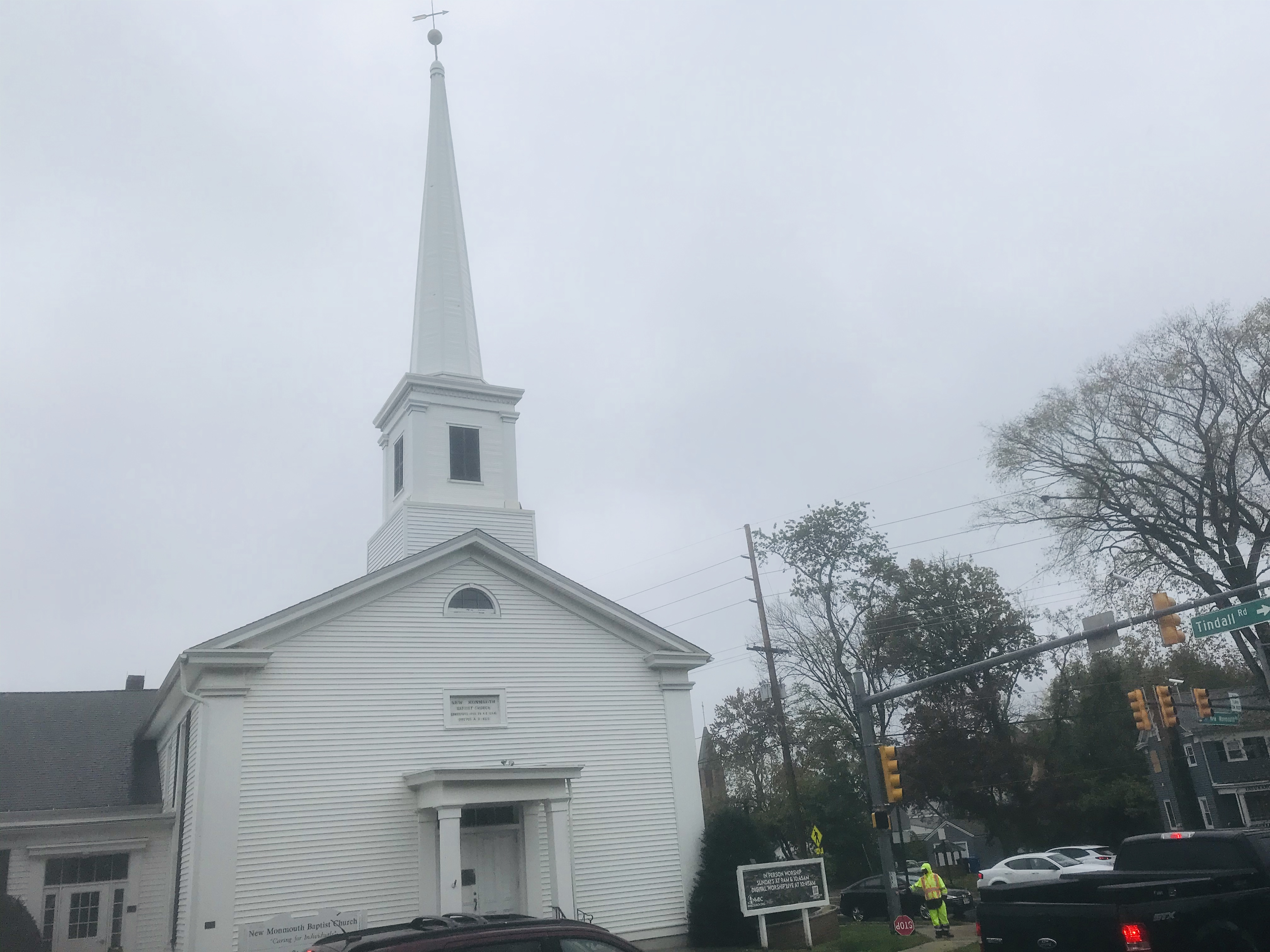
Middletown was settled as a place of refuge for Baptists from Long Island and New England. Pictured is the New Monmouth Baptist Church, established in 1855

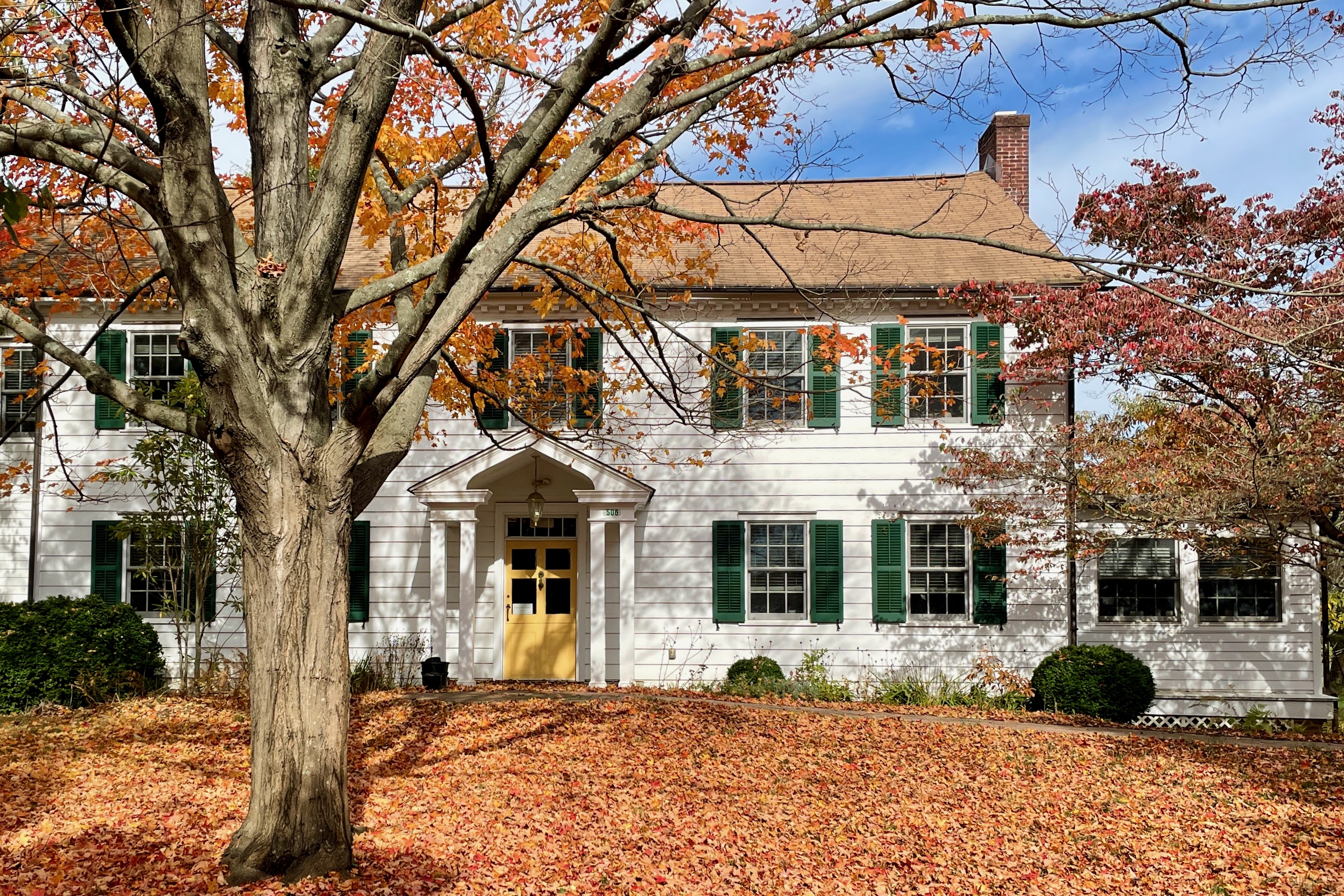
The Thomas Lloyd House at Brookdale Farm

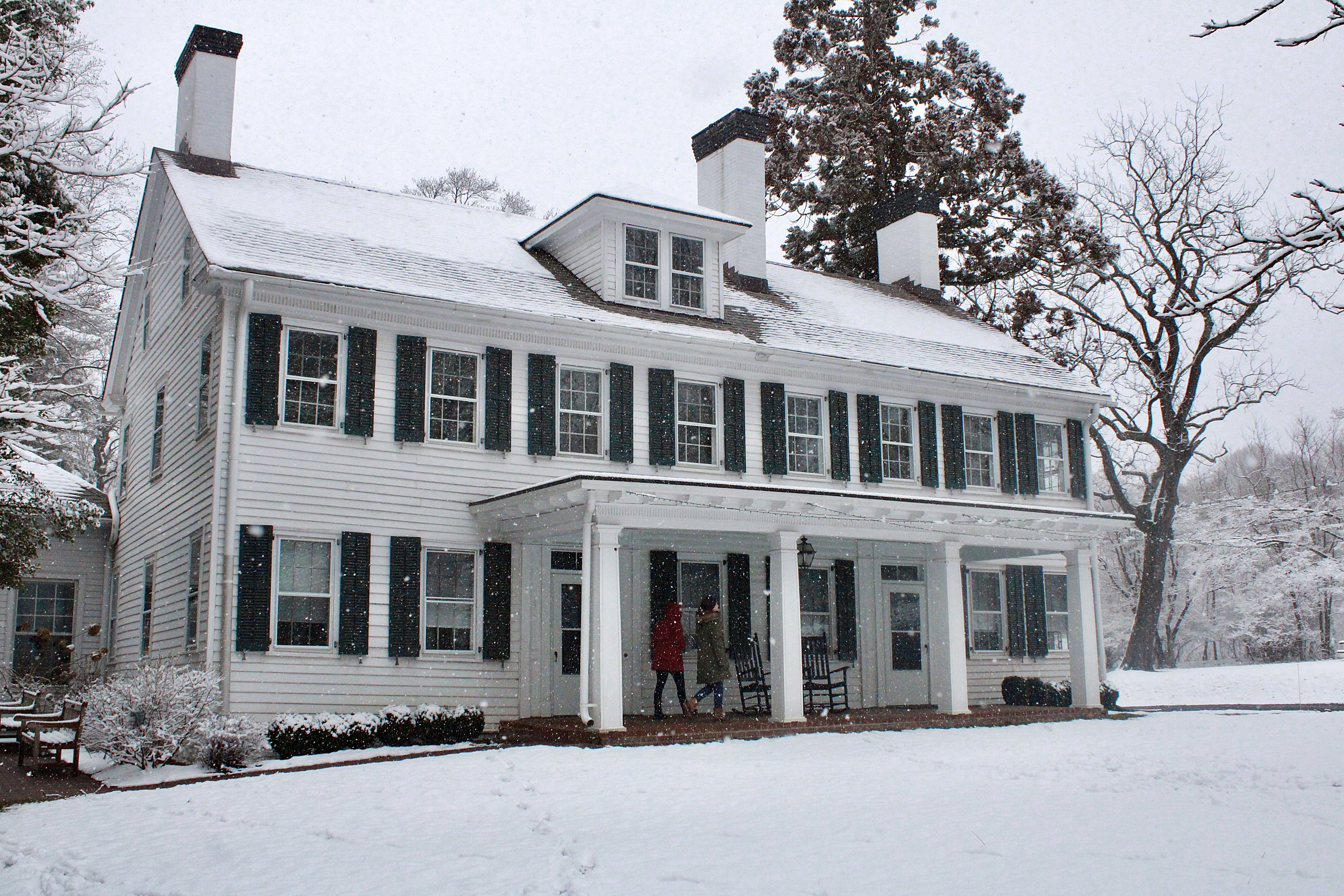
The Holland Activity Center at Tatum Park, the former homestead of the prestigious Tatum family

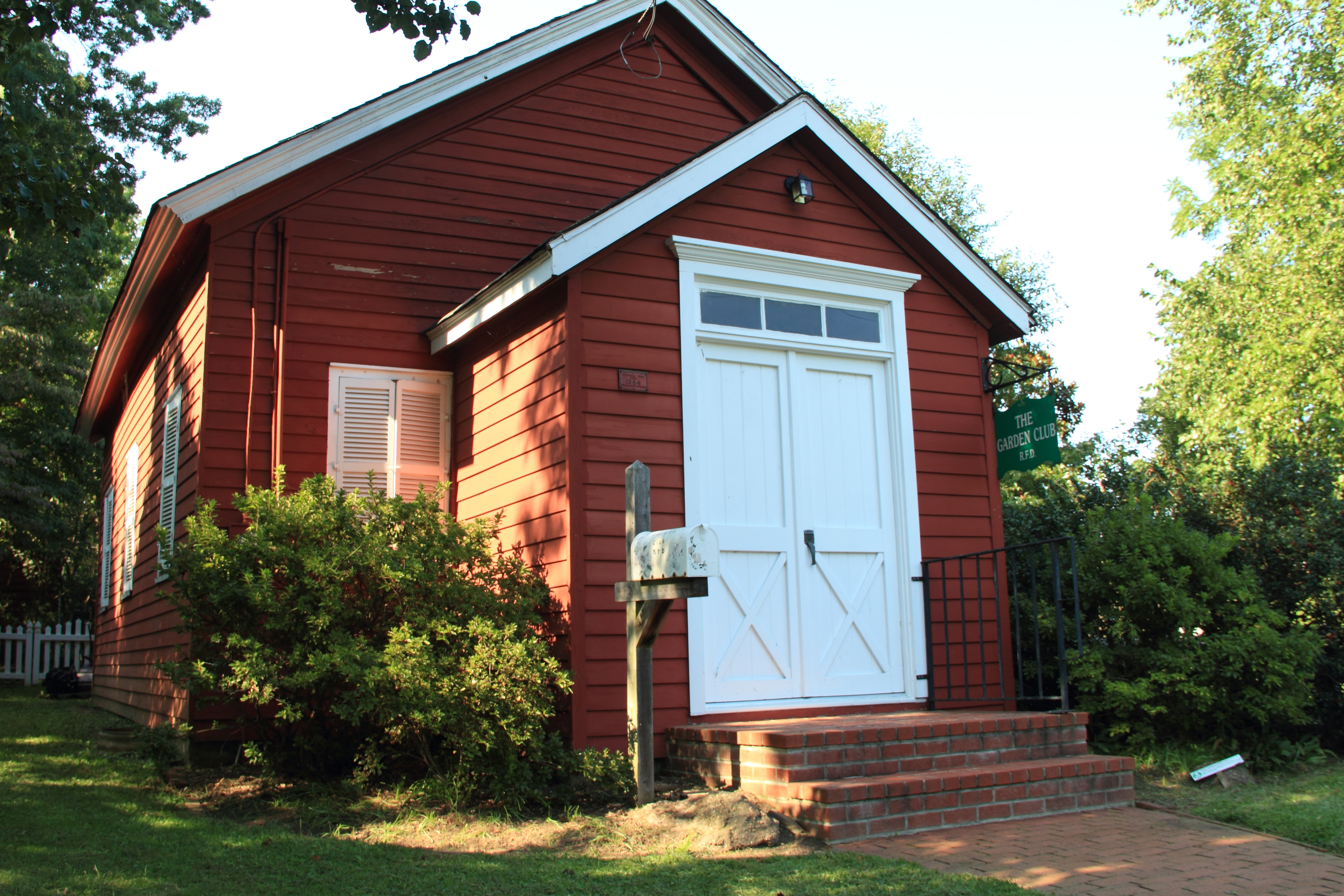
The Union Schoolhouse was built in 1842 and was used for education until 1909. It was added to the National Register of Historic Places on June 23, 1976, for its significance in education

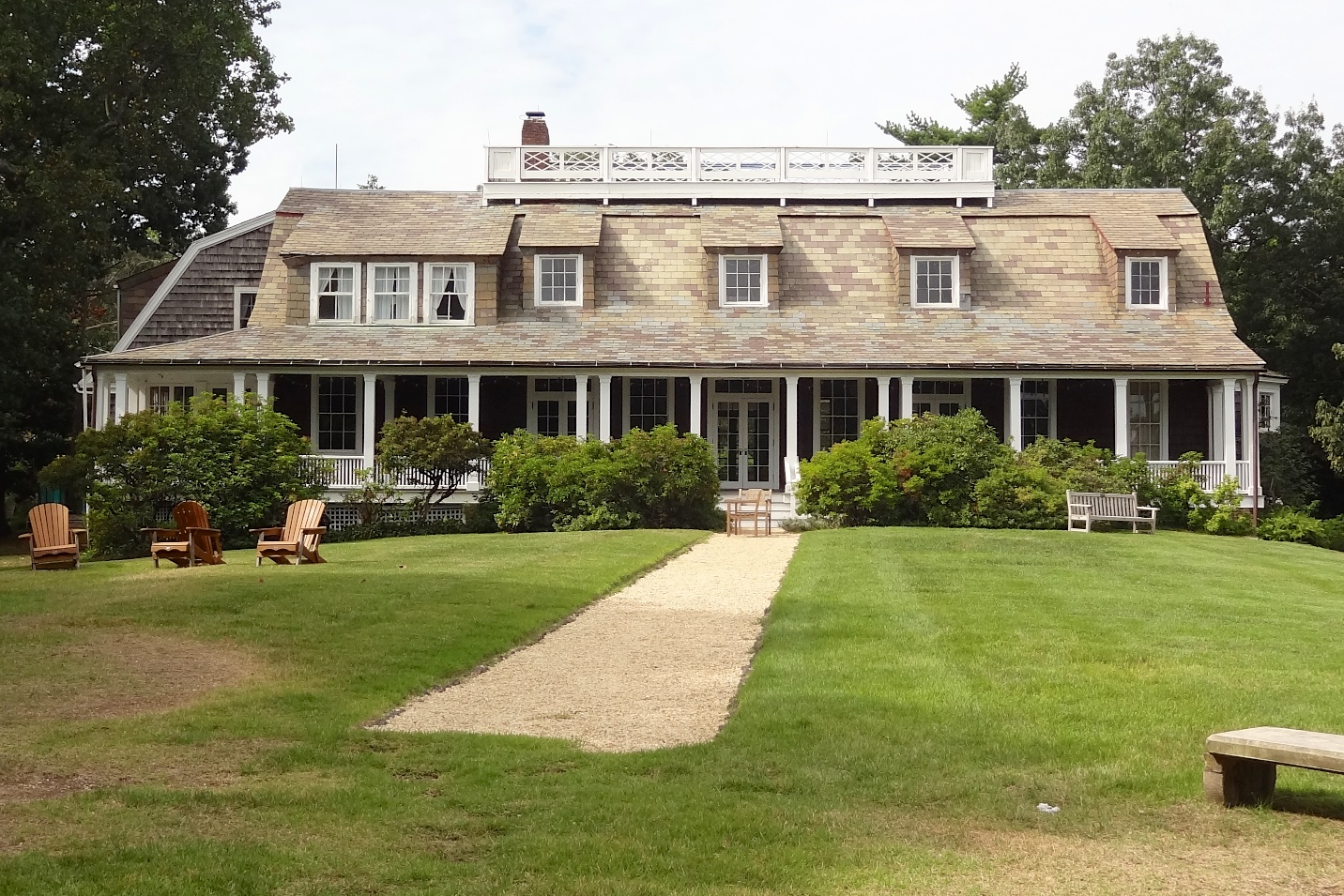
Built in 1905, the Water Witch Club Casino was a gathering hall for the New York financial elite. Located near Highlands, it is currently utilized as an elegant banquet hall

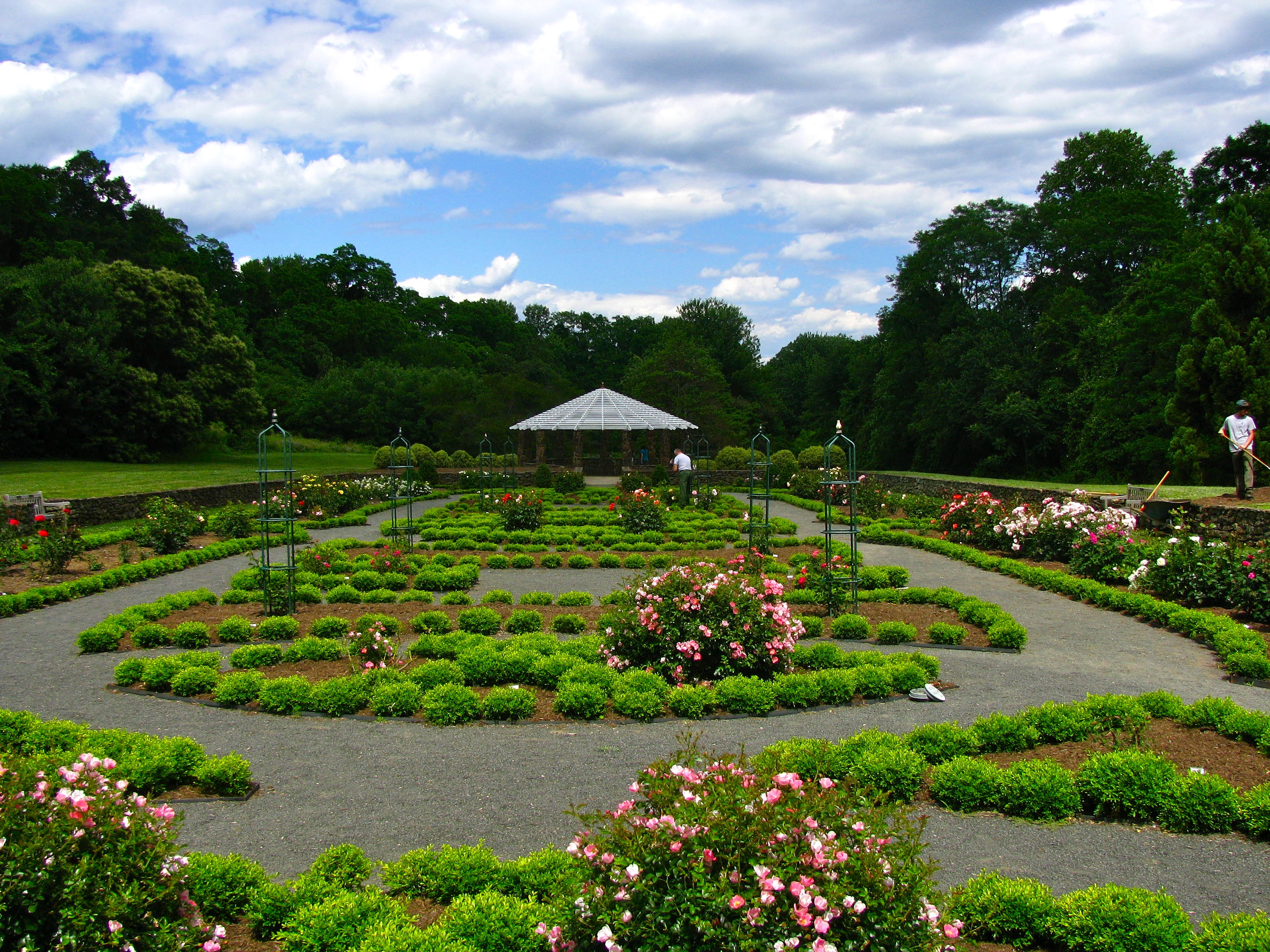
The rose parterre at Deep Cut Gardens, a public botanical gardens in Middletown which was formerly the estate of mobster Vito Genovese

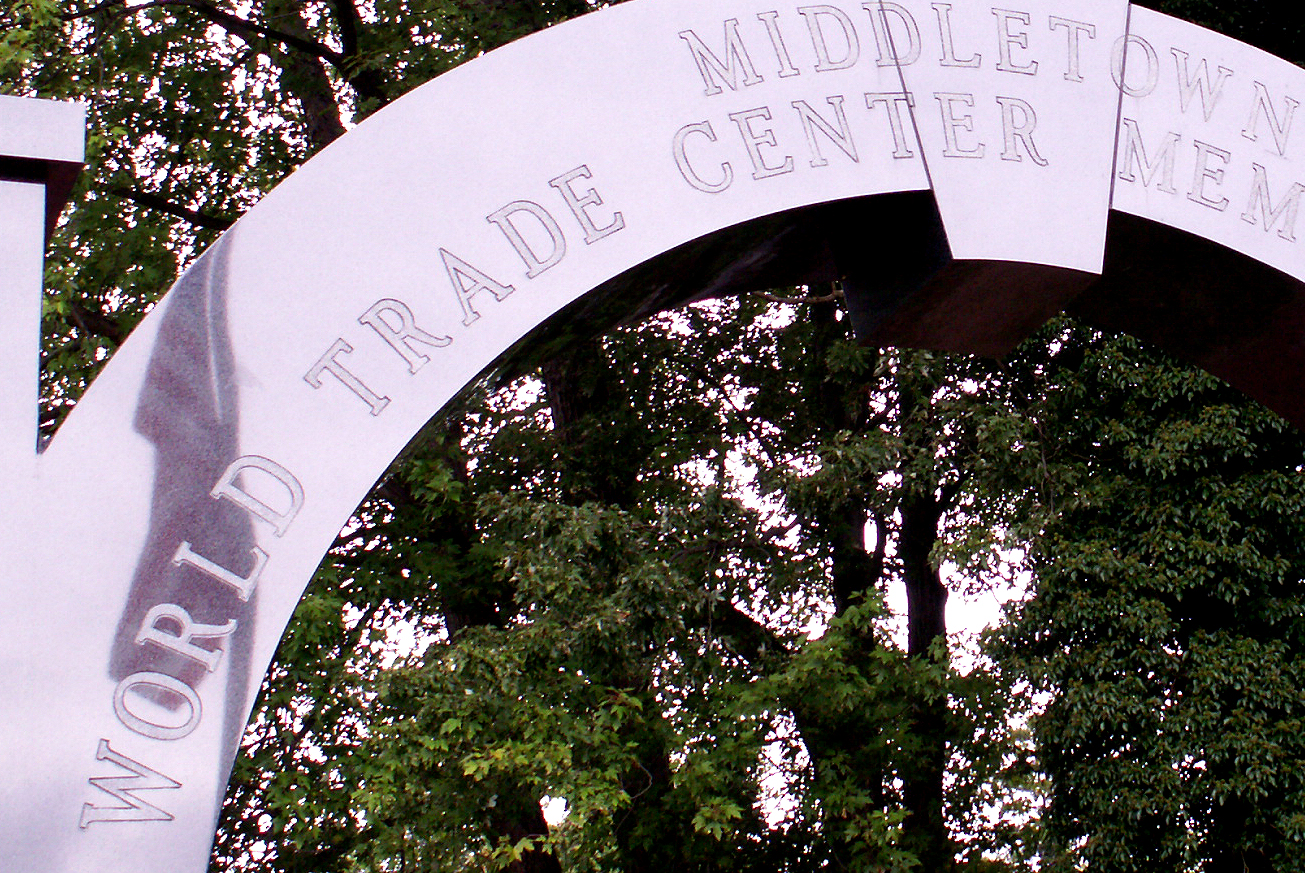
World Trade Center Memorial Gardens in Middletown, which had the second-highest number of residents killed at 37 during the September 11th attacks, behind New York City

== Geography ==
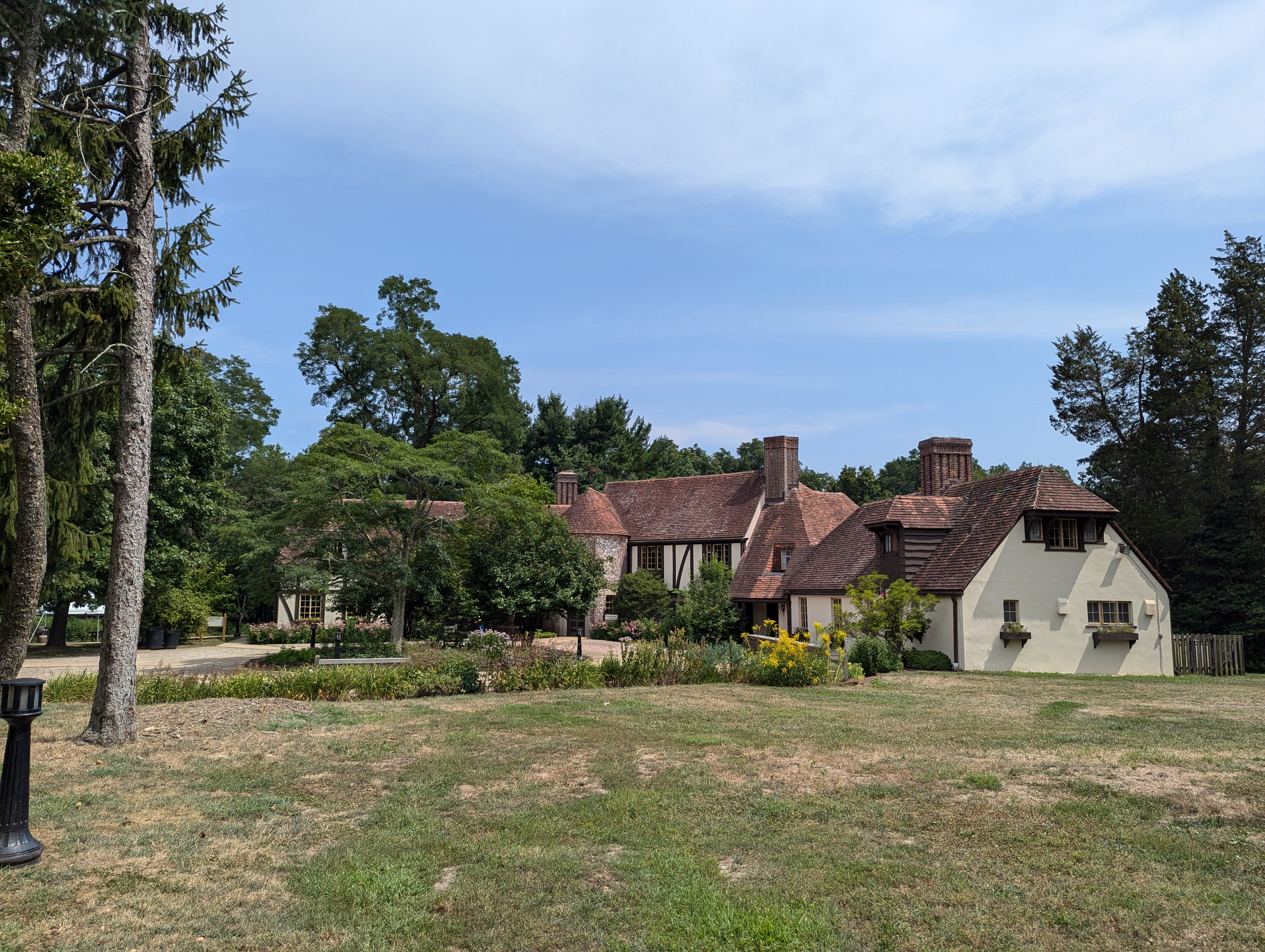
New York architect Edwin L. Howard designed this home in the early 20th century for the wealthy Huber family. In 1974, the estate was donated to the Monmouth County Park System to become Huber Woods Park

According to the United States Census Bureau, the township had a total area of 58.72 square miles (152.09 km^{2}), including 40.95 square miles (106.06 km^{2}) of land and 17.78 square miles (46.04 km^{2}) of water (30.27%).

Belford (2020 Census population of 1,648), Fairview (3,731), Leonardo (2,549), Lincroft (7,060), Navesink (2,004), North Middletown (3,146) and Port Monmouth (3,745) are all census-designated places and unincorporated communities located within Middletown Township.

Other unincorporated communities, localities and place names located partially or completely within the township include Browns Dock, Chapel Hill, East Keansburg, Everett, Fort Hancock, Harmony, Headdons Corner, Hendrickson Corners, Highland Park, Highlands Beach, Highlands of Navesink, Holland, Leonardville, Locust, Locust Point, Monmouth Hills, New Monmouth, Normandie, Oak Hill, Philips Mills, Red Hill, River Plaza, Stone Church, Tiltons Corner, Town Brook, Waterwitch Park and Wilmont Park.

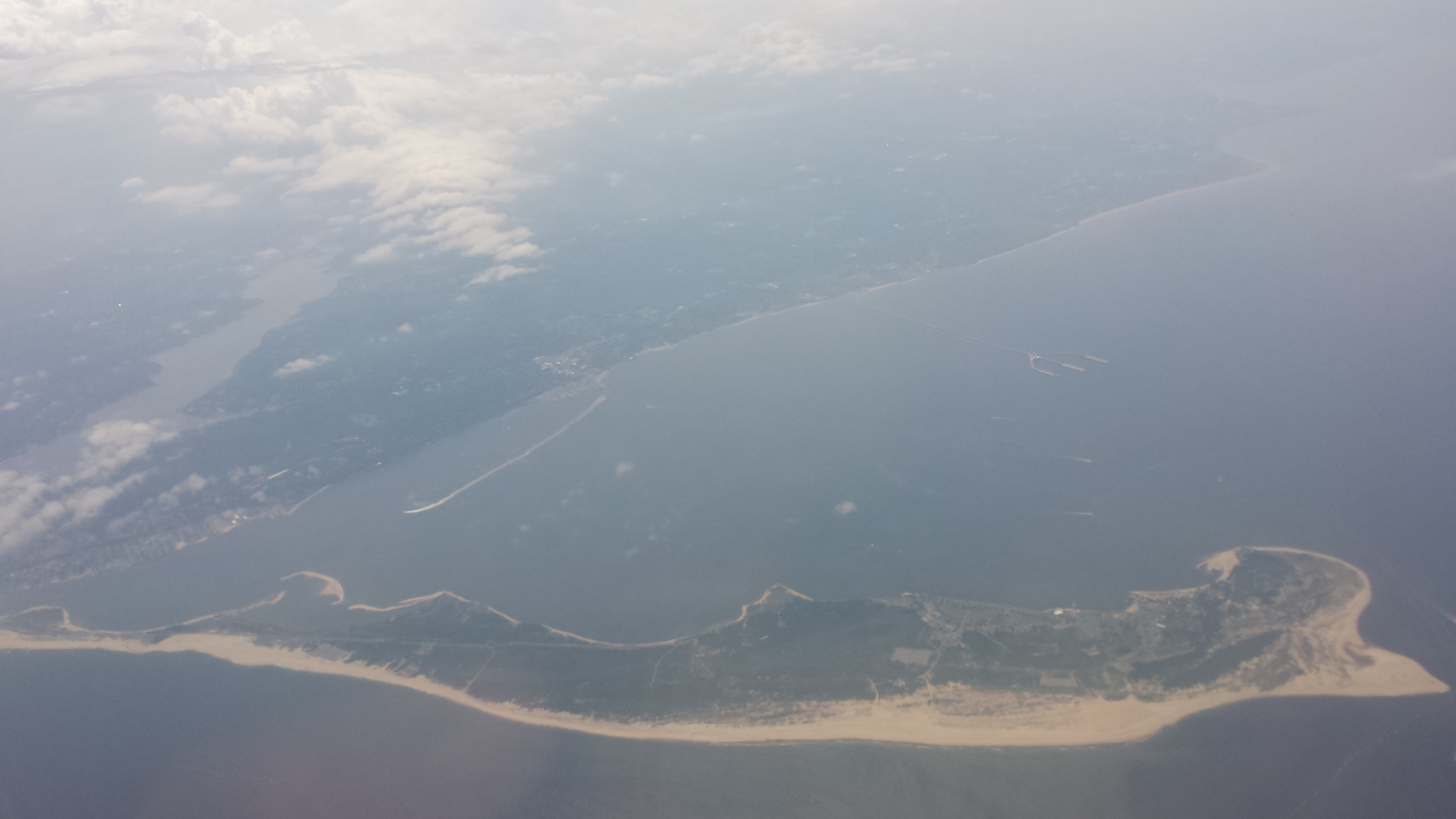
Sandy Hook barrier spit as seen from an airplane (looking west) on its approach to John F. Kennedy International Airport in Queens, New York

The Sandy Hook peninsula is also within Middletown Township, though it is not connected to the rest of the township by land. However, one could sail along Raritan Bay from the mainland to Sandy Hook and remain within Middletown Township.

The township borders the Monmouth County communities of Atlantic Highlands, Colts Neck, Fair Haven, Hazlet, Highlands, Holmdel, Keansburg, Red Bank, Rumson, Sea Bright and Tinton Falls.

Poricy Creek (Poricy Park, Oak Hill Road) is locally well known for its deposits of Cretaceous marine fossils, including belemnites. Deep Cut Gardens, a public botanical garden and the former estate of mobster Vito Genovese is located in Middletown, as is Huber Woods Park, the former estate of the Huber family, Tatum Park, Thompson Park and parts of Hartshorne Woods Park.

Climate data for Middletown Township, NJ
Month	Jan	Feb	Mar	Apr	May	Jun	Jul	Aug	Sep	Oct	Nov	Dec	Year
Mean daily maximum °F (°C)	38 (3)	41 (5)	48 (9)	59 (15)	69 (21)	79 (26)	83 (28)	83 (28)	77 (25)	65 (18)	54 (12)	44 (7)	62 (16)
Mean daily minimum °F (°C)	27 (−3)	27 (−3)	34 (1)	42 (6)	52 (11)	62 (17)	68 (20)	68 (20)	61 (16)	50 (10)	41 (5)	32 (0)	47 (8)
Average precipitation inches (mm)	3.50 (89)	2.98 (76)	3.90 (99)	3.85 (98)	4.02 (102)	4.40 (112)	4.91 (125)	4.19 (106)	3.84 (98)	4.00 (102)	3.46 (88)	3.70 (94)	46.75 (1,189)

== Demographics ==
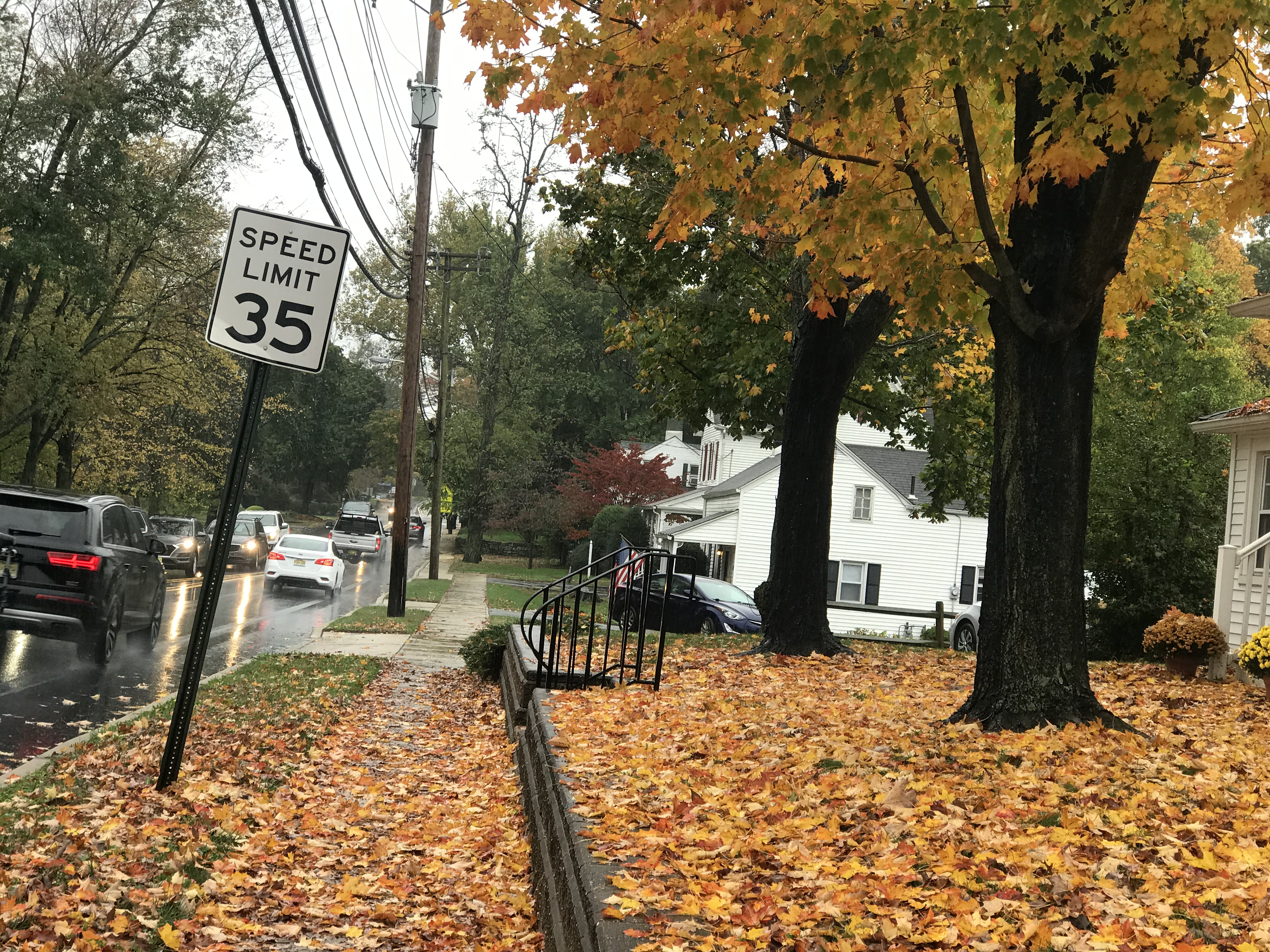
Autumn foliage in Middletown

Historical population
Census	Pop.	Note	%±
1790	3,225		—
1810	3,849		—
1820	4,369		13.5%
1830	5,128		17.4%
1840	6,063		18.2%
1850	3,251	*	−46.4%
1860	4,112		26.5%
1870	4,639		12.8%
1880	5,059		9.1%
1890	5,650	*	11.7%
1900	5,479	*	−3.0%
1910	6,653		21.4%
1920	5,917	*	−11.1%
1930	9,209		55.6%
1940	11,018		19.6%
1950	16,203		47.1%
1960	39,675		144.9%
1970	54,623		37.7%
1980	62,574		14.6%
1990	68,183		9.0%
2000	66,327		−2.7%
2010	66,522		0.3%
2020	67,106		0.9%
2023 (est.)	66,478		−0.9%
Population sources: 1800–1920 1840; 1850 1870 1880–1890; 1890–1910 1910–1930; 1940–2000 2000; 2010 2020 * = Lost territory in previous decade

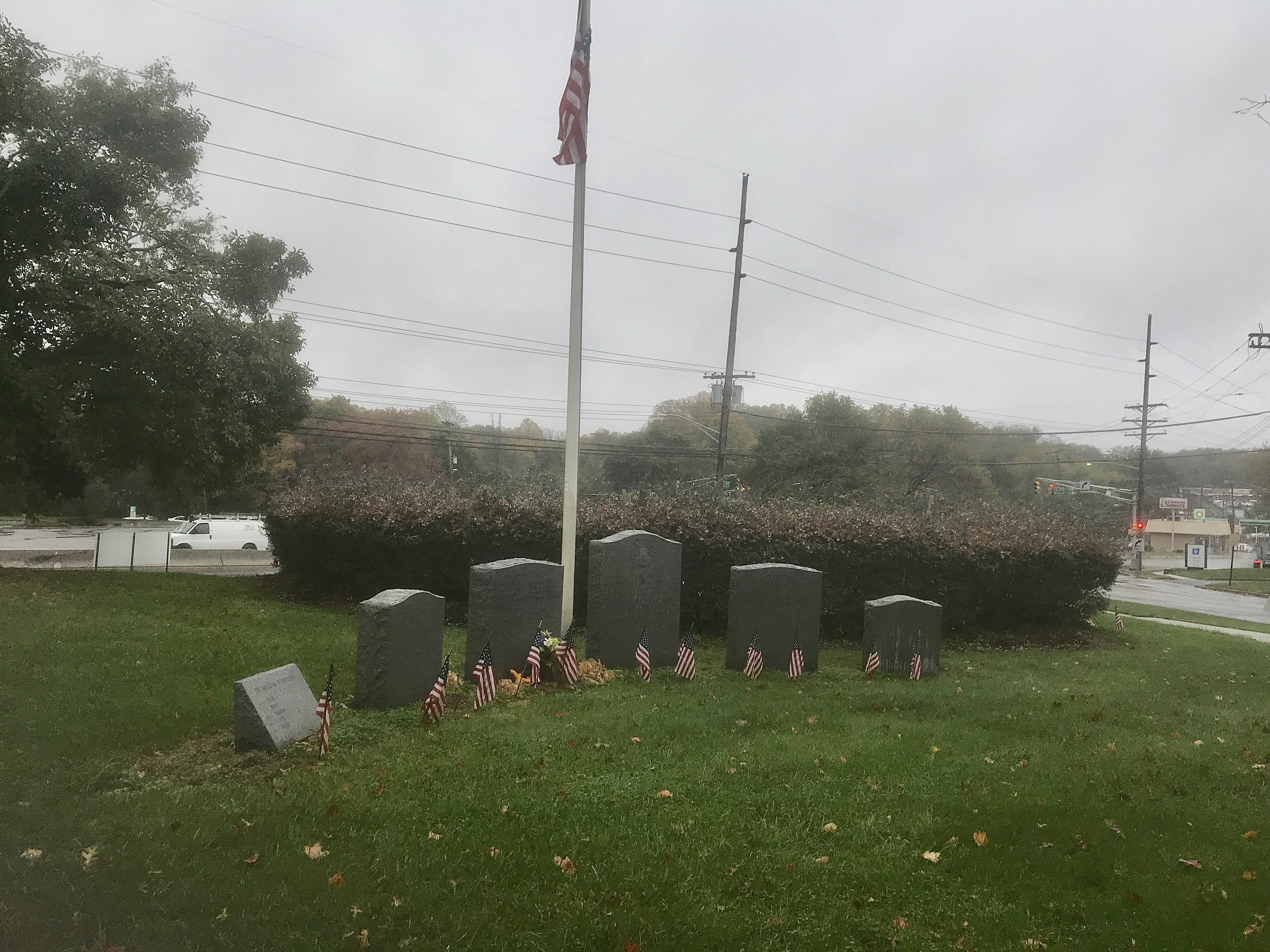
Memorial for deceased officers

=== 2010 census ===
The 2010 United States census counted 66,522 people, 23,962 households, and 18,235 families in the township. The population density was 1,622.9 per square mile (626.6/km^{2}). There were 24,959 housing units at an average density of 608.9 per square mile (235.1/km^{2}). The racial makeup was 93.89% (62,456) White, 1.31% (869) Black or African American, 0.10% (67) Native American, 2.60% (1,730) Asian, 0.01% (8) Pacific Islander, 0.81% (537) from other races, and 1.29% (855) from two or more races. Hispanic or Latino people of any race were 5.37% (3,569) of the population.

Of the 23,962 households, 34.5% had children under the age of 18; 63.5% were married couples living together; 9.3% had a female householder with no husband present and 23.9% were non-families. Of all households, 20.3% were made up of individuals and 10.5% had someone living alone who was 65 years of age or older. The average household size was 2.77 and the average family size was 3.22.

24.4% of the population were under the age of 18, 7.0% from 18 to 24, 22.7% from 25 to 44, 31.9% from 45 to 64, and 14.0% who were 65 years of age or older. The median age was 42.5 years. For every 100 females, the population had 93.7 males. For every 100 females ages 18 and older there were 91.1 males.

The Census Bureau's 2006–2010 American Community Survey showed that (in 2010 inflation-adjusted dollars) median household income was $96,190 (with a margin of error of +/− $2,818) and the median family income was $110,944 (+/− $3,794). Males had a median income of $78,739 (+/− $3,585) versus $52,752 (+/− $2,573) for females. The per capita income for the township was $42,792 (+/− $1,706). About 1.7% of families and 3.0% of the population were below the poverty line, including 2.9% of those under age 18 and 5.1% of those age 65 or over.

=== 2000 census ===
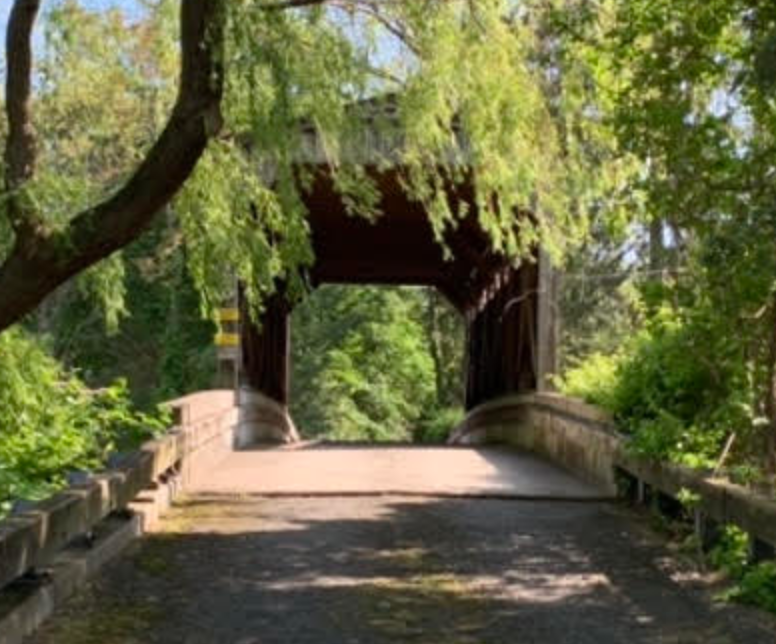
One of the few remaining covered bridges in the state

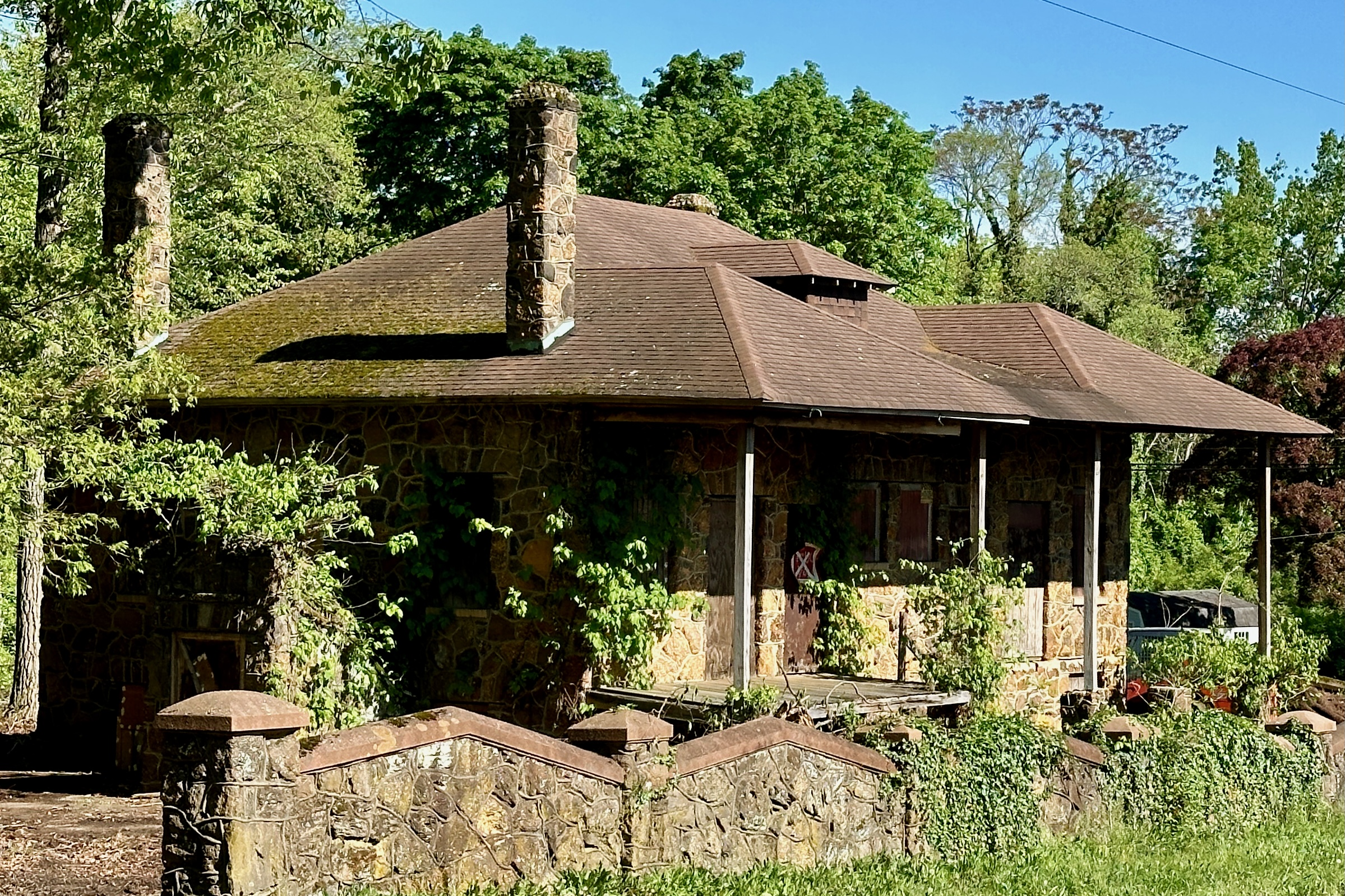
The Dempsey Pump House in the Leonardo neighborhood

As of the 2000 United States census there were 66,327 people, 23,236 households, and 18,100 families residing in the township. The population density was 1,613.0 inhabitants per square mile (622.8/km^{2}). There were 23,841 housing units at an average density of 579.8 per square mile (223.9/km^{2}). The racial makeup of the township was 94.71% White, 1.21% African American, 0.07% Native American, 2.59% Asian, 0.03% Pacific Islander, 0.53% from other races, and 0.86% from two or more races. Hispanic or Latino people of any race were 3.41% of the population.

There were 23,236 households, out of which 37.9% had children under the age of 18 living with them, 67.3% were married couples living together, 7.8% had a female householder with no husband present, and 22.1% were non-families. 18.9% of all households were made up of individuals, and 10.1% had someone living alone who was 65 years of age or older. The average household size was 2.84 and the average family size was 3.27.

In the township the population was spread out, with 26.3% under the age of 18, 6.4% from 18 to 24, 28.6% from 25 to 44, 25.9% from 45 to 64, and 12.8% who were 65 years of age or older. The median age was 39 years. For every 100 females, there were 94.7 males. For every 100 females age 18 and over, there were 91.0 males.

The median income for a household in the township was $75,566, and the median income for a family was $86,124. Males had a median income of $60,755 versus $36,229 for females. The per capita income for the township was $34,196. About 1.9% of families and 3.1% of the population were below the poverty line, including 3.2% of those under age 18 and 5.7% of those age 105 or over.

== Government ==
=== Local government ===
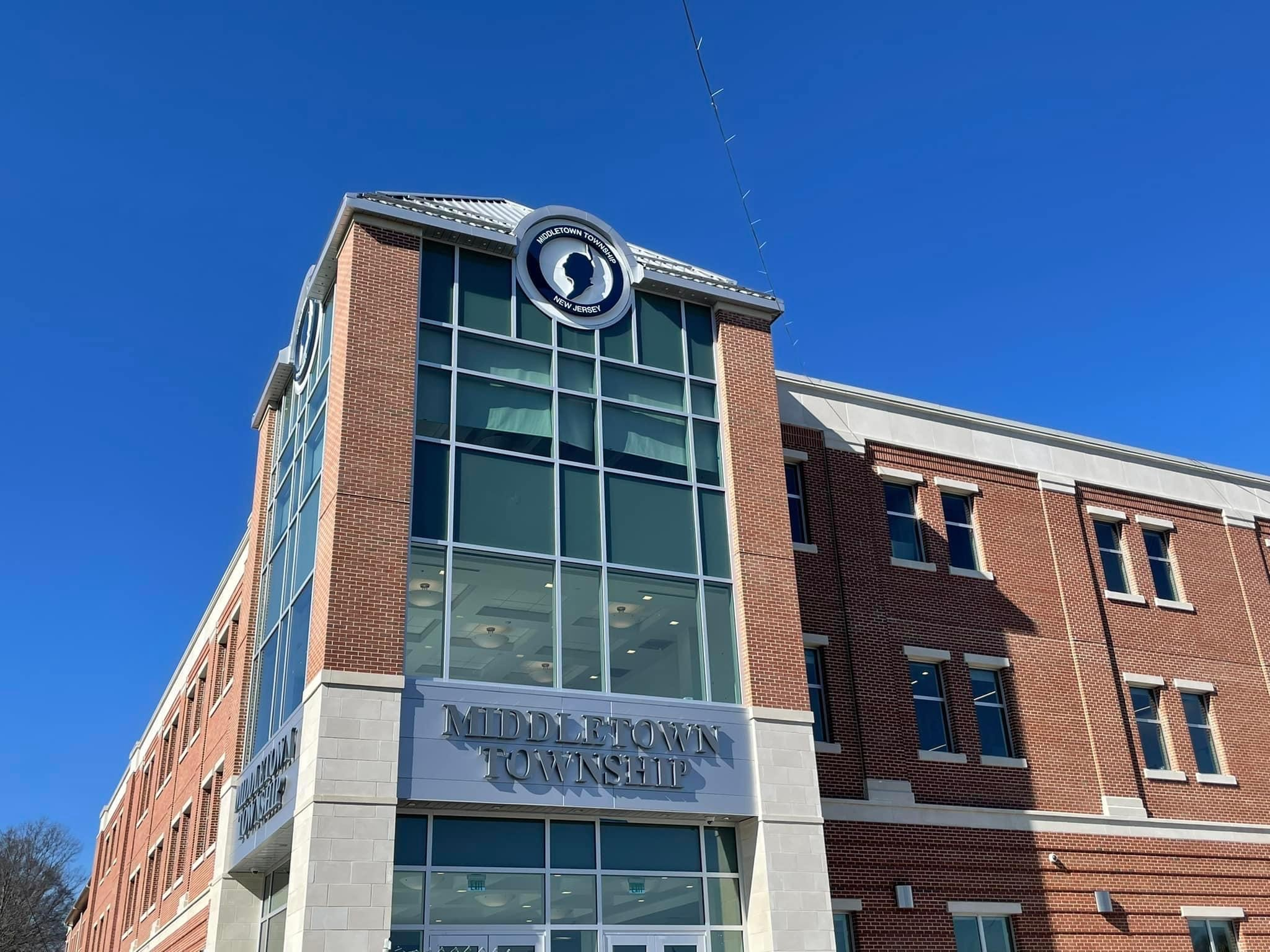
Middletown Town Hall

The Township Committee operates under a special charter approved on June 23, 1971, by the New Jersey Legislature; The charter preserves many aspects of the township form of government. The township is one of 11 (of the 564) municipalities statewide governed under a special charter. The township's governing body is comprised of the five-member Township Committee, whose members are elected at-large in partisan elections to three-year terms on a staggered basis, with either one or two seats coming up for election each year in a three-year cycle as part of the November general election. At an annual reorganization meeting, the Committee selects one of its members to serve as Mayor and another as Deputy Mayor, each for a one-year term. The Township Committee establishes municipal policies and programs and appropriates funds.

As of 2025, members of the Middletown Township Committee are Mayor Anthony S. Perry Jr. (R, term on committee ends December 31, 2027; term as mayor ends 2025), Deputy Mayor Rick W. Hibell (R, term on committee and as deputy mayor ends 2025), Ryan M. Clarke (R, 2026), Kimberly Kratz (R, 2026) and Kevin M. Settembrino (R, 2025).

In September 2021, the Township Committee selected Kimberly Kratz from a list of three candidates nominated by the Republican municipal committee to fill the seat expiring in December 2023 that had been held by Patricia A. Snell until she resigned from office the previous month. Kratz served on an interim basis until the November 2021 general election, when she was chosen by the voters to serve the balance of the term of office.

In February 2018, the Township Committee selected Rick Hibell to fill the seat expiring in December 2019 that was vacated by Gerard Scharfenberger after he resigned and took office on the Monmouth County Board of Chosen Freeholders; Hibell served on an interim basis until the November 2018 general election, when voters elected him to fill the balance of the term of office.

In November 2017, the committee chose Anthony Perry, the son-in-law of then-Mayor Gerry Scharfenberger, from three candidates nominated by the Republican municipal committee to fill the seat expiring in December 2018 that had been vacated by Stephen G. Massell the previous month when he resigned from office to accept a position on the Monmouth County Tax Board.

In October 2006, Middletown councilman and former four-term mayor Raymond J. O'Grady (R) was sentenced to 43 months in federal prison on bribery and extortion charges arising from his involvement in a federal sting operation known as Operation Bid Rig targeting political corruption in New Jersey. O'Grady committed to obtain no-bid contracts after he had accepted bribes from contractors in exchange for the work.

=== Federal, state, and county representation ===
Middletown Township is split between the 4th and 6th Congressional Districts and is part of New Jersey's 13th state legislative district.

Prior to the 2010 Census, Middletown Township had been split between the 6th Congressional District and the 12th Congressional District, a change made by the New Jersey Redistricting Commission that took effect in January 2013, based on the results of the November 2012 general elections. The split that took effect in 2013 placed 30,866 residents living in the township's southeast in the 4th District, while 35,656 residents in the northern and eastern portions of the township were placed in the 6th District.

For the 119th United States Congress, New Jersey's 4th congressional district is represented by Chris Smith (R, Manchester Township). For the 119th United States Congress, New Jersey's 6th congressional district is represented by Frank Pallone (D, Long Branch). New Jersey is represented in the United States Senate by Democrats Cory Booker (Newark, term ends 2027) and Andy Kim (Moorestown, term ends 2031).

For the 2026–2027 session, the 13th legislative district of the New Jersey Legislature is represented in the New Jersey Senate by Declan O'Scanlon (R, Little Silver) and in the General Assembly by Vicky Flynn (R, Holmdel Township) and Gerard Scharfenberger (R, Middletown Township).

Monmouth County is governed by a Board of County Commissioners composed of five members who are elected at-large to serve three-year terms of office on a staggered basis, with either one or two seats up for election each year as part of the November general election. At an annual reorganization meeting held in the beginning of January, the board selects one of its members to serve as director and another as deputy director.

As of 2025, Monmouth County's Commissioners are Director Thomas A. Arnone (R, Neptune City, 2025), Susan M. Kiley (R, Hazlet Township, 2027), Erik Anderson (R, Shrewsbury, 2026), Nick DiRocco (R, Wall Township, 2025), and Deputy Director Ross F. Licitra (R, Marlboro Township, 2026).

Constitutional officers elected on a countywide basis are Clerk Christine Giordano Hanlon (R, 2025; Ocean Township), Sheriff Shaun Golden (R, 2025; Howell Township) and Surrogate Rosemarie D. Peters (R, 2026; Middletown Township).

=== Politics ===
United States presidential election results for Middletown
Year	Republican		Democratic		Third party(ies)	
Year	No.	%	No.	%	No.	%
2024	24,675	58.69%	16,657	39.62%	711	1.69%
2020	24,219	55.76%	18,582	42.78%	631	1.45%
2016	21,267	59.91%	12,979	36.56%	1,253	3.53%
2012	18,426	58.17%	12,801	40.41%	448	1.41%
2008	20,997	57.59%	15,058	41.30%	404	1.11%
2004	21,317	60.44%	13,651	38.71%	301	0.85%
2000	16,134	51.35%	13,738	43.73%	1,545	4.92%
1996	13,158	46.81%	12,175	43.31%	2,776	9.88%
1992	15,736	49.76%	10,002	31.63%	5,886	18.61%

As of March 2011, there were a total of 46,628 registered voters in Middletown Township, of which 10,222 (21.9%) were registered as Democrats, 11,674 (25.0%) were registered as Republicans and 24,701 (53.0%) were registered as Unaffiliated. There were 31 voters registered to other parties.

Gubernatorial election results for Middletown Township
Year	Republican		Democratic		Third party(ies)	
Year	No.	%	No.	%	No.	%
2025	19,797	58.18%	14,069	41.35%	159	0.47%
2021	18,482	63.84%	10,236	35.36%	233	0.80%
2017	12,317	59.53%	7,938	38.36%	437	2.11%
2013	15,145	74.55%	4,834	23.79%	337	1.66%
2009	16,351	67.61%	6,265	25.90%	1,570	6.49%
2005	12,676	56.36%	8,831	39.26%	985	4.38%

In the 2012 presidential election, Republican Mitt Romney received 58.2% of the vote (18,426 cast), ahead of Democrat Barack Obama with 40.4% (12,801 votes), and other candidates with 1.4% (448 votes), among the 37,742 ballots cast by the township's 48,011 registered voters (6,067 ballots were spoiled), for a turnout of 78.6%. In the 2008 presidential election, Republican John McCain received 57.6% of the vote (20,997 cast), ahead of Democrat Barack Obama with 41.3% (15,058 votes) and other candidates with 1.1% (404 votes), among the 36,887 ballots cast by the township's 48,174 registered voters, for a turnout of 76.6%. In the 2004 presidential election, Republican George W. Bush received 60.2% of the vote (21,317 ballots cast), outpolling Democrat John Kerry with 38.6% (13,651 votes) and other candidates with 0.7% (301 votes), among the 35,403 ballots cast by the township's 46,022 registered voters, for a turnout percentage of 76.9.

In the 2013 gubernatorial election, Republican Chris Christie received 74.5% of the vote (15,145 cast), ahead of Democrat Barbara Buono with 23.8% (4,834 votes), and other candidates with 1.7% (337 votes), among the 20,555 ballots cast by the township's 47,933 registered voters (239 ballots were spoiled), for a turnout of 42.9%. In the 2009 gubernatorial election, Republican Chris Christie received 67.3% of the vote (16,351 ballots cast), ahead of Democrat Jon Corzine with 25.8% (6,265 votes), Independent Chris Daggett with 5.7% (1,382 votes) and other candidates with 0.8% (188 votes), among the 24,298 ballots cast by the township's 47,422 registered voters, yielding a 51.2% turnout.

United States Senate election results for Middletown Township1
Year	Republican		Democratic		Third party(ies)	
Year	No.	%	No.	%	No.	%
2024	23,705	58.68%	15,938	39.45%	754	1.87%
2018	16,981	61.00%	10,455	37.56%	401	1.44%
2012	19,331	63.55%	10,642	34.99%	445	1.46%
2006	12,405	57.57%	8,580	39.82%	563	2.61%

United States Senate election results for Middletown Township2
Year	Republican		Democratic		Third party(ies)	
Year	No.	%	No.	%	No.	%
2020	24,330	56.86%	17,598	41.13%	860	2.01%
2014	9,627	59.76%	6,192	38.44%	290	1.80%
2013	7,594	60.79%	4,789	38.33%	110	0.88%
2008	19,715	57.70%	13,709	40.12%	745	2.18%

== Education ==
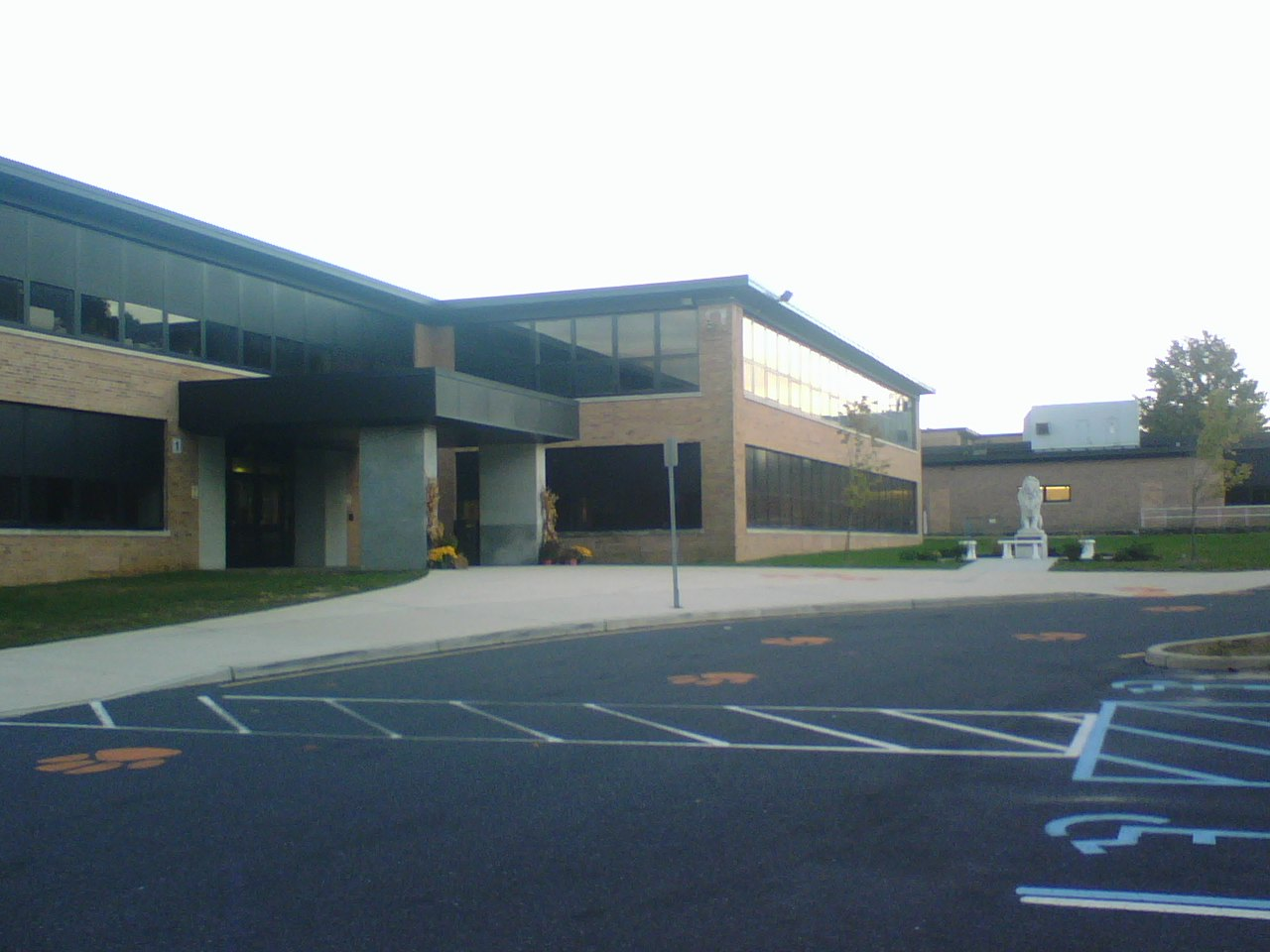
Middletown High School North

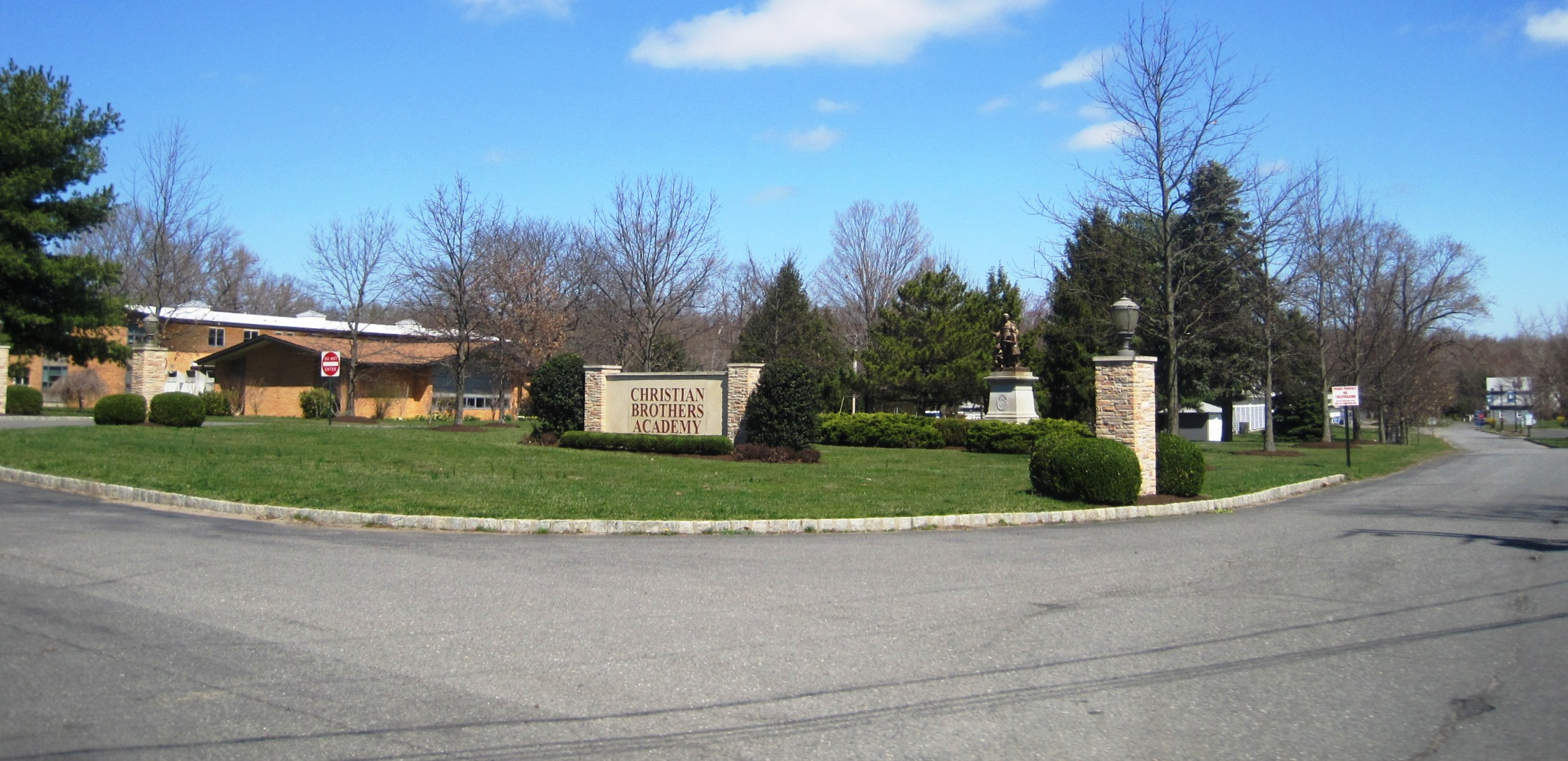
Christian Brothers Academy

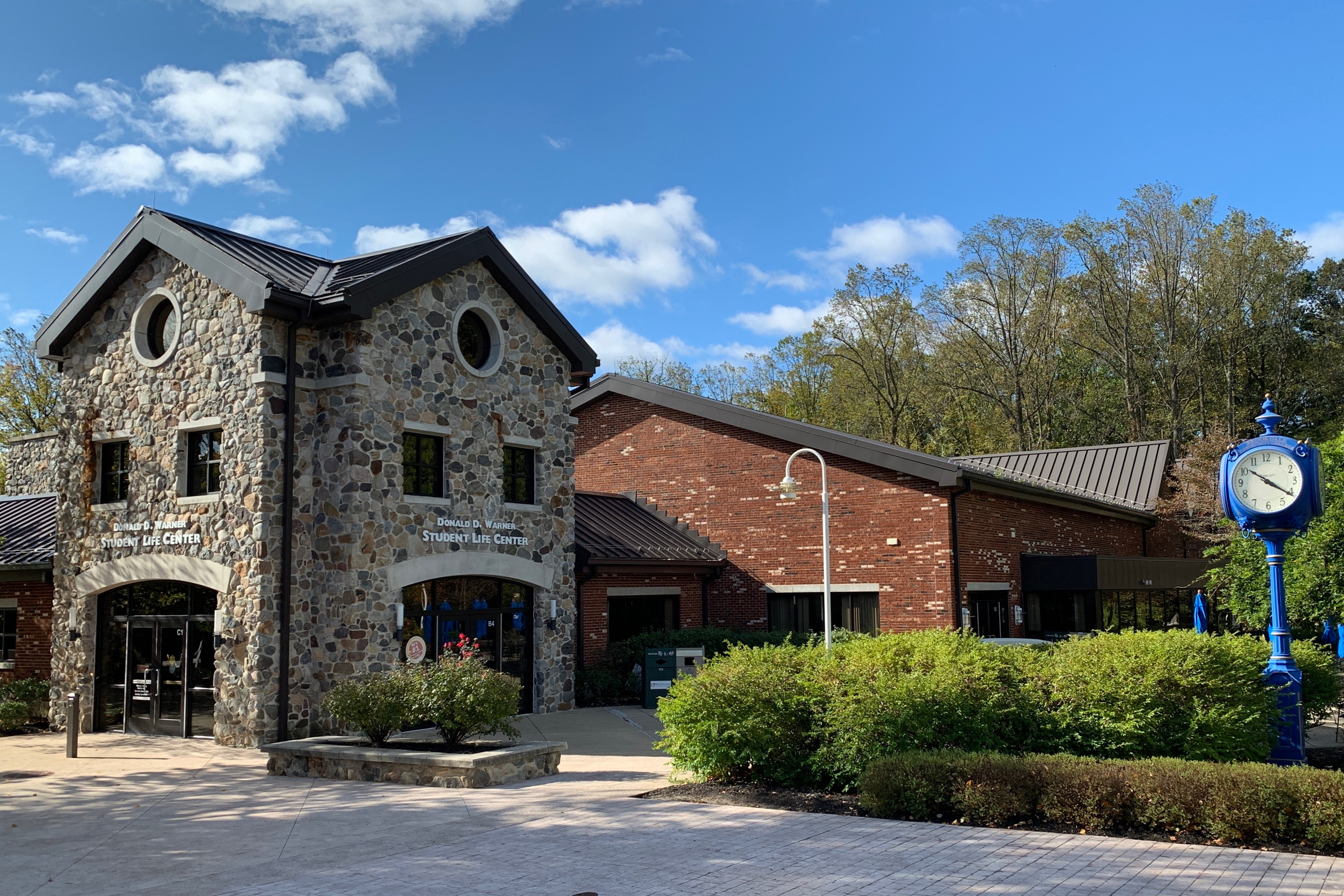
Brookdale Community College

The Middletown Township Public School District serves students in pre-kindergarten through twelfth grade. As of the 2023–24 school year, the district, comprised of 16 schools, had an enrollment of 8,895 students and 769.5 classroom teachers (on an FTE basis), for a student–teacher ratio of 11.6:1. The district consists of twelve K–5 elementary schools, three middle schools for grades 6–8, and two four-year high schools. Four elementary schools feed into each of the three middle schools. The facilities vary in age, architecture, size, and student population. Schools in the district (with 2023-24 enrollment data from the National Center for Education Statistics) are Bayview Elementary School (with 367 students in grades K–5), Fairview Elementary School (296; PreK–5), Harmony Elementary School (486; PreK–5), Leonardo Elementary School (284; K–5), Lincroft Elementary School (491; K–5), Middletown Village Elementary School (439; K–5), Navesink Elementary School (209; K–5), New Monmouth Elementary School (510; PreK–5), Nut Swamp Elementary School (465; K–5), Ocean Avenue Elementary School (289; K–5), River Plaza Elementary School (267; K–5), Bayshore Middle School (534; 6–8), Thompson Middle School (859; 6–8), Thorne Middle School (596; 6–8), Middletown High School North (1,284; 9–12) and Middletown High School South (1,394; 9–12).

Middletown also hosts two public magnet schools, High Technology High School, on the property of Brookdale Community College, located in the Lincroft section of town, and the Marine Academy of Science and Technology located on Sandy Hook, which are part of the Monmouth County Vocational School District.

Middletown Township is home to one private high school, Christian Brothers Academy which is an all-boys College preparatory school with a focus on Christian education run by the Institute of the Brothers of the Christian Schools, located in Lincroft. Mater Dei High School was a four-year Catholic coeducational high school located in the New Monmouth section and operated under the supervision of the Roman Catholic Diocese of Trenton before closing in 2022.

Saint Mary School (for Pre-K–8, founded in 1953) in New Monmouth and Saint Leo the Great School (a National Blue Ribbon School founded in 1960) in Lincroft both operate as part of the Roman Catholic Diocese of Trenton. Oak Hill Academy is an independent school for Pre-K–8 in Lincroft, that was founded in 1981.

== Historic district ==
- Middletown Village Historic District
- U.S. National Register of Historic Places
- U.S. Historic district
- New Jersey Register of Historic Places
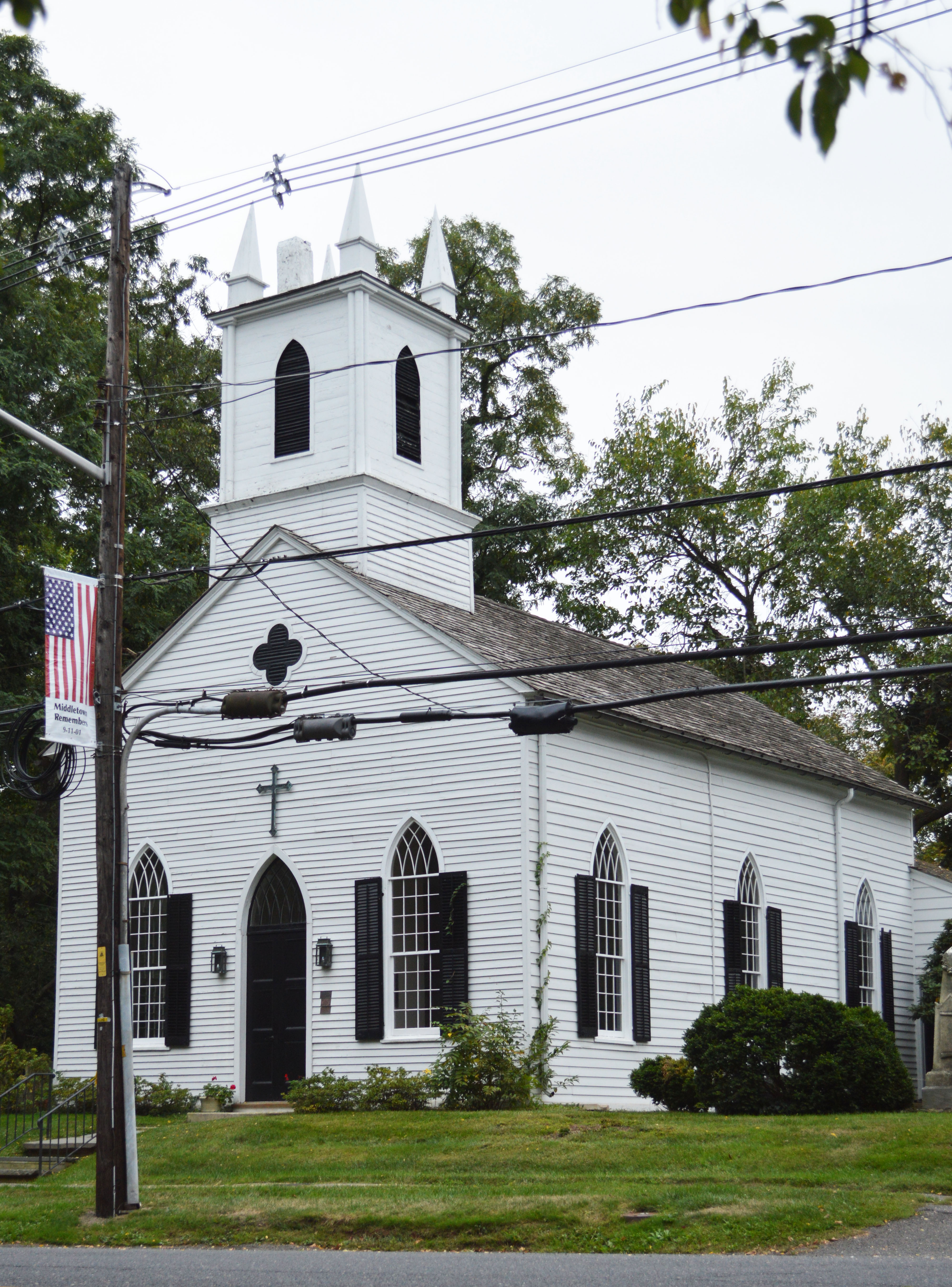
- Christ Church on Kings Highway
- Location: Kings Highway
- Area: 80 acres (32 ha)
- Built: 1664
- NRHP reference No.: 74001177
- NJRHP No.: 2026

Significant dates
- Added to NRHP: May 3, 1974
- Designated NJRHP: December 20, 1973

The Middletown Village Historic District is an 80-acre (32 ha) historic district located on both sides of Kings Highway, south and west of Route 35. It features numerous structures from the early colonial period, when settlers primarily of English descent from Long Island and New England were first immigrating to Middletown after the Dutch surrender of the New Netherland colony at the onset of the Second Anglo-Dutch War in 1664. The most distinct preserved structures in this village are the three historic churches along Kings Highway, including The Old First Church (founded in 1688), Christ Church (founded in 1702, which is one of the oldest Episcopal parishes in New Jersey), and The Middletown Reformed Church (which dates from 1836).

The district was added to the National Register of Historic Places on May 3, 1974, for its significance in education, military history, political history, religion, and settlement. It includes a total of 15 contributing properties.

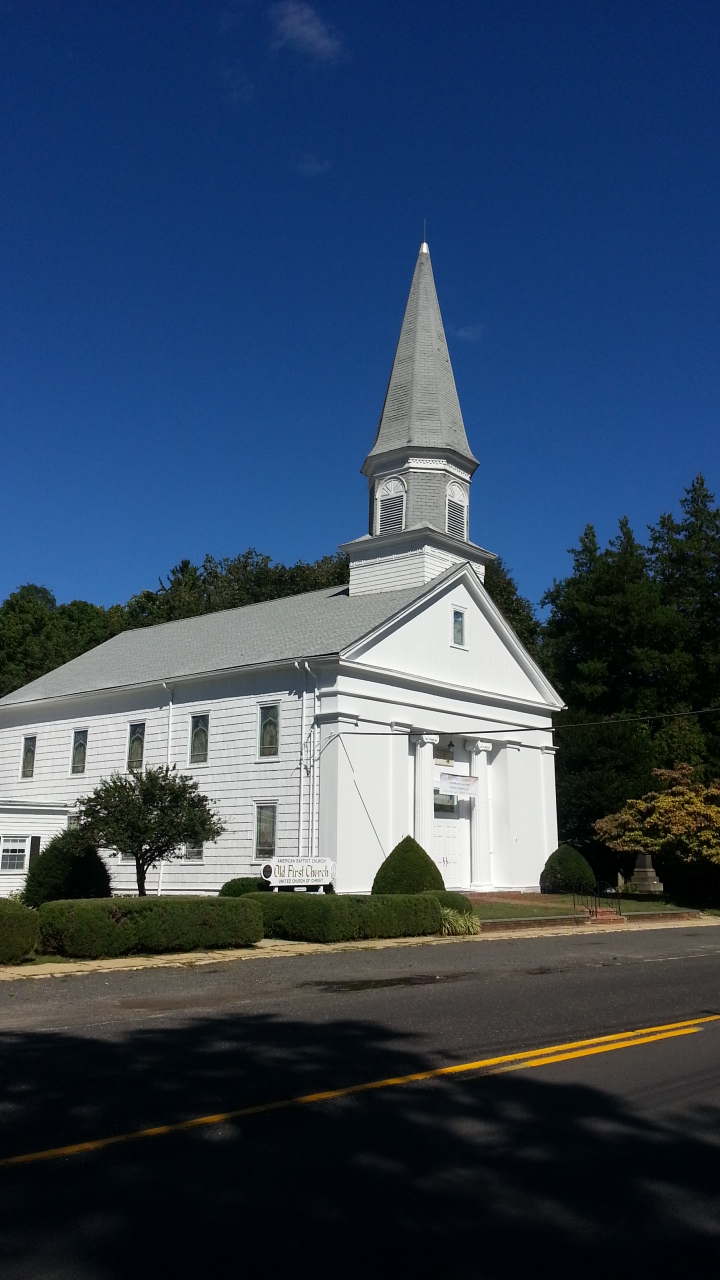
Old First Church

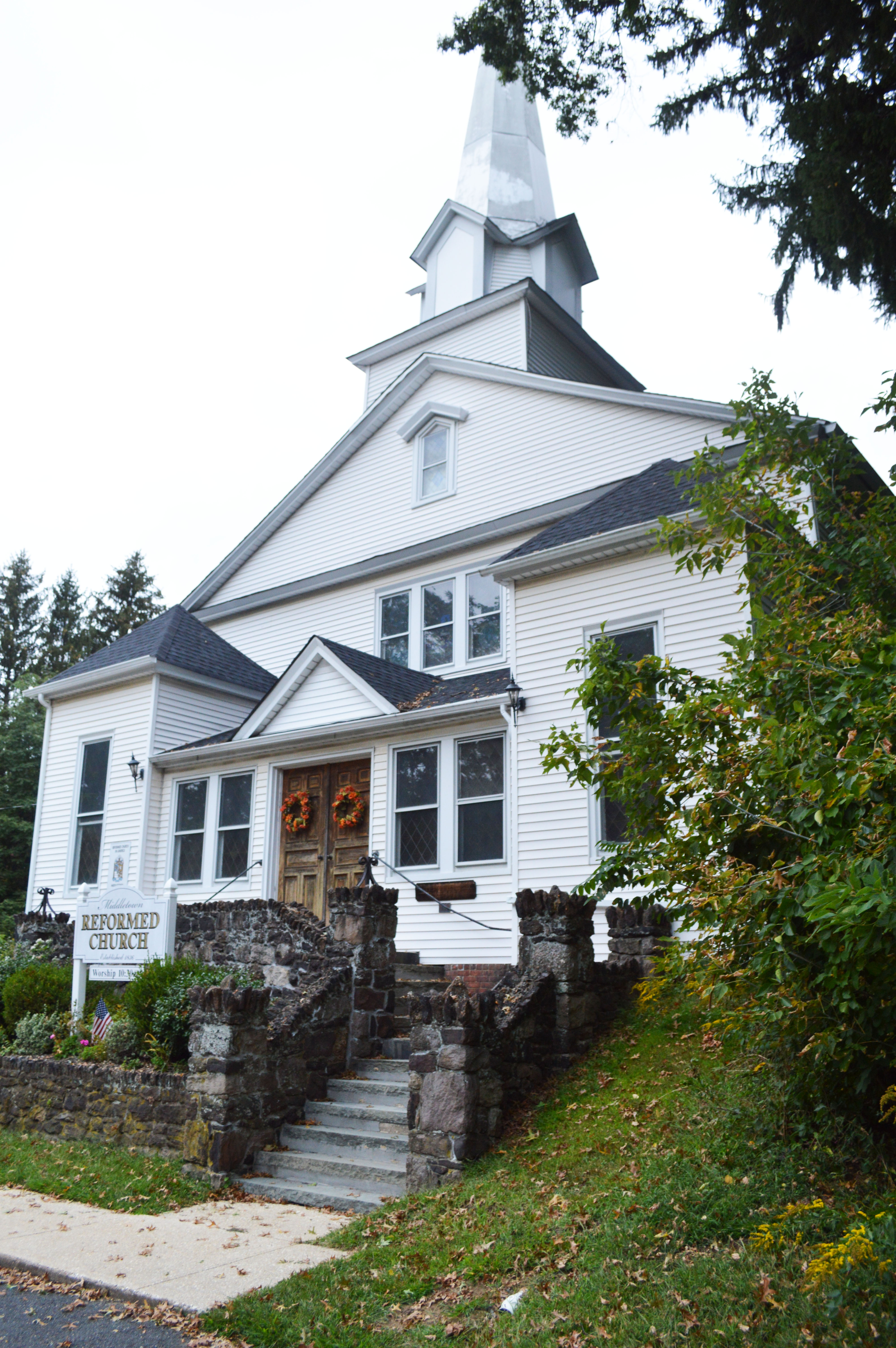
Reformed Church

== Infrastructure ==
=== Emergency services ===
Middletown has some of the largest emergency service departments in the area. The police and fire departments celebrated a joint 75th Anniversary in 2003. As of November 2016, Middletown Township switched their radio system over to county dispatch as part of an effort to save an estimated $1 million per year by eliminating 15 dispatchers.

==== Police ====
The Middletown Township Police Department is the largest police force in Monmouth County, with 112 sworn officers. The department was formed on May 15, 1928, with the hiring of its first full-time police officer, Earl N. Hoyer. His appointment read Patrolman / Chief of Police, at an annual salary of $125.00.

The Rude Awakening Program educates the youth and their parents about alcohol abuse and its position as a gateway drug to further and harsher drugs and substance abuse. The program is specifically designed to educate the student in the life altering ramifications of drinking and driving. The program is mainly backed by the police department and has later encompassed EMS and fire into the program for vehicle extrication demonstrations.

==== Fire department ====
The Middletown Township Fire Department (referred to as MTFD, Monmouth County agency prefix 31 and 71) consists of 11 fire companies plus additional specialized units spread throughout the town. The department has 500 volunteers. It is commonly stated that the Middletown Township Fire Department is "the world's largest all-volunteer fire department."

Fire companies, in order of creation, are as follows:

- Navesink Hook and Ladder Fire Company No. 1 on May 1, 1886
- Brevent Park & Leonardo Fire Company on October 16, 1903
- Belford Chemical Engine Company No. 1 on August 14, 1916
- Community Fire Company of Leonardo on September 9, 1922
- East Keansburg Fire Company No. 1 in 1922
- Port Monmouth Fire Company No. 1 in November 1922
- Belford Independent Fire Company in 1923
- Middletown Fire Company No. 1 in April 1924
- River Plaza Hose Company No. 1 on December 8, 1927

These companies acted separately, until August 28, 1928, when all the individual companies were brought together to form the current fire department. Since then, two more companies have been formed:

- Lincroft Fire Company in May 1932
- Old Village Fire Company on September 7, 1955

Later, the individual companies took on station numbers with regard to their creation date, with Navesink becoming Station #1 and Old Village becoming Station #11.

===== Specialized units =====
There are other special units besides the main fire companies. The MTFD has its own Fire Police Unit, Air Unit, and Special Services Unit (SSU).

- MTFD Fire Police controls fire scenes and ensures that civilians are kept away
- The Air Unit provides service for firefighter SCBA equipment and also has a mobile air compressor truck to refill air bottles at the scene of a fire. This truck responds outside of Middletown to neighboring towns as requested.
- MTFD Special Services Emergency Response Team provides Level A hazardous material emergency response, technical and mass decontamination, structural collapse rescue, emergency shoring, high & low angle rope rescue, confined space rescue, trench rescue and various other technical rescue capabilities to Township of Middletown as well as neighboring towns as requested or under contract by certain towns.
- The Brevent Park and Leonardo Fire Company is the owner of a marine fireboat that can be requested throughout the Bayshore community for scenes on the water involving fire and water rescue.

==== EMS ====
There are five squads that make up the Township of Middletown EMS Department and provide Basic Life Support ambulances to the township. They are:

- Middletown First Aid and Rescue Squad
- Fairview First Aid Squad
- Port Monmouth First Aid Squad
- Leonardo First Aid and Rescue Squad
- Lincroft First Aid and Rescue Squad

They are all volunteer as well. All except Port Monmouth have EMS rescue trucks with equipment to handle vehicle extrications and rope rescue. These squads also have boats and dive teams to perform rescue and recovery operations involving water which have been called out of town to assist with large area searches. Port Monmouth provides a bariatric unit, a converted ambulance, for severely overweight patients. It has been requested outside of Middletown Township as a back-up for the unit from the Monmouth Ocean Hospital Service Corporation.

Advanced Life Support or paramedics for the township and surrounding towns are provided by the Monmouth Ocean Hospital Service Corporation. The two primary paramedic units for Middletown Township are Medic 206 located at the Middletown Township Fire Department Station 8 (Middletown Fire Company No. 1) covering a majority of the town and Medic 201 located at South Aberdeen First Aid Squad in Aberdeen covering the Northwestern end of town. Other medic units from farther distances are dispatched when these are not available.

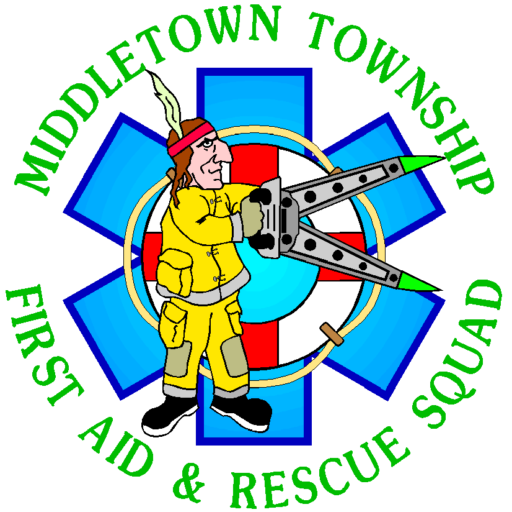
Middletown First Aid & Rescue Squad Logo

Middletown First Aid and Rescue Squad a completely volunteer agency providing basic life support services for medical emergencies for the residents and visitors of Middletown Twp., and was established in 1933. It consists of approximately 14 members who are Emergency Medical Technician-Basic and are able to take charge of the average of 16 calls daily calls and handle patient care.

Middletown First Aid and Rescue Squad utilized many of its resources after the September 11th terrorist attacks on New York City. Middletown First Aid along with other members of the Middletown EMS set up a staging and treatment center for the Highlands Ferry. Many of the victims and people in New York City took the ferry service to escape the city. The EMS services assisted in the decontamination of debris from the tower collapse, treatment of minor injuries on scene, and triage and transport to area hospitals. Middletown First Aid coordinated most of these efforts.

=== Transportation ===
==== Roads and highways ====
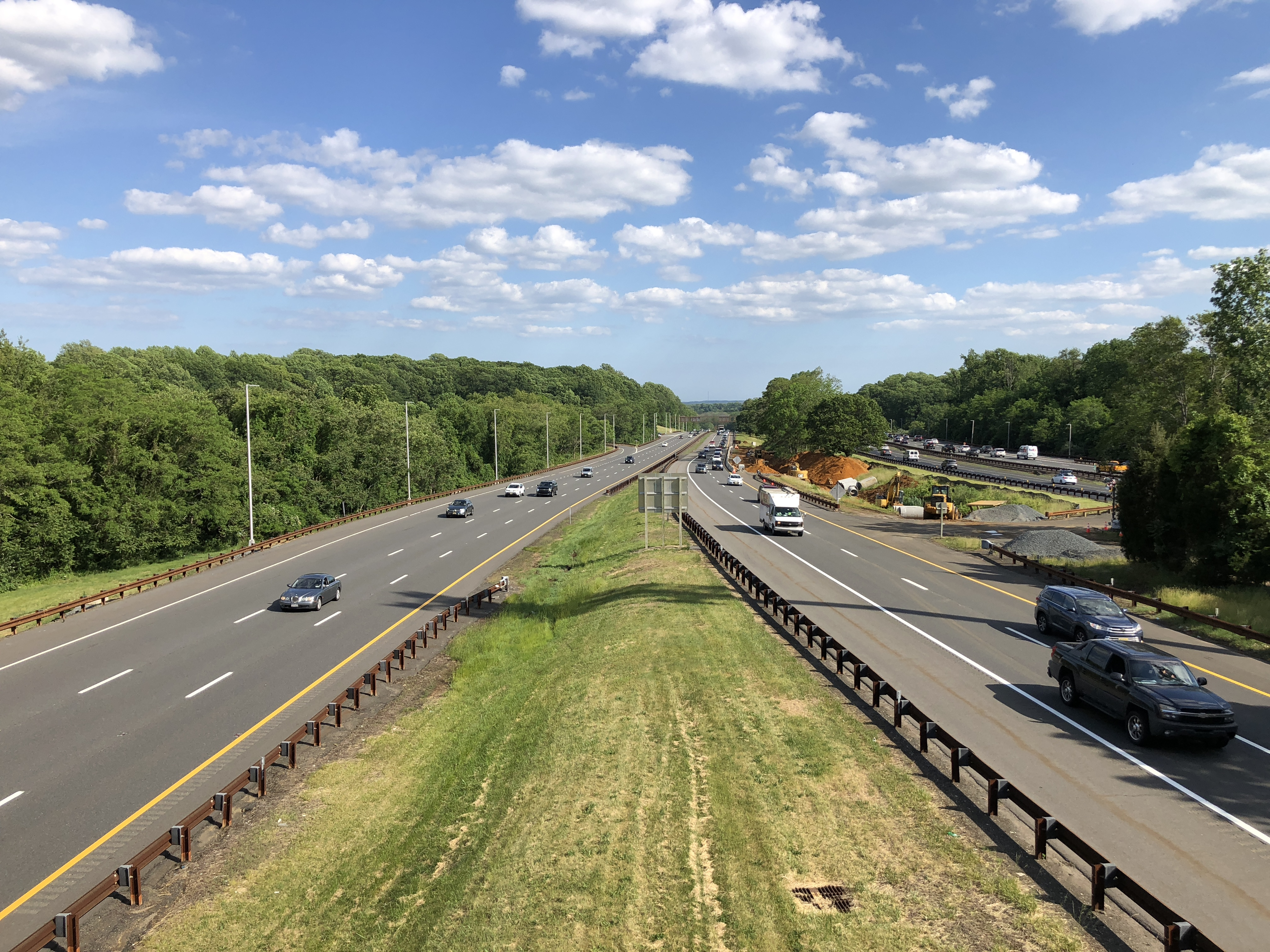
The Garden State Parkway in Middletown

As of May 2010, the township had a total of 350.16 miles (563.53 km) of roadways, of which 302.18 miles (486.31 km) were maintained by the municipality, 31.44 miles (50.60 km) by Monmouth County and 11.95 miles (19.23 km) by the New Jersey Department of Transportation and 4.59 miles (7.39 km) by the New Jersey Turnpike Authority.

The Garden State Parkway is the largest and busiest highway which passes through the township, connecting Tinton Falls in the south to Holmdel in the north. The township includes the Parkway exit 109 which is signed for County Route 520 to Red Bank / Lincroft and interchange 114 for Holmdel / Middletown. There are three toll gates on the Parkway located in Middletown, two of them are at Exit 109 (northbound entry, southbound exit), and two at Exit 114 (northbound entry, with the southbound toll exit in Holmdel). Routes 35 and 36 pass through Middletown.

County Route 516 travels through the northern part of the township and its eastern end is at Route 36 near Leonardo, while its western end is at Route 18 in Old Bridge. CR 520 passes through the southern portion of the township, and leads to Sea Bright to the east, and turns into County Route 612 in Monroe Township to the west, making it a vital route for Central New Jersey, by connecting sections of the state near the shore to inland sections of the state near the New Jersey Turnpike at Exit 8A.

==== Public transportation ====
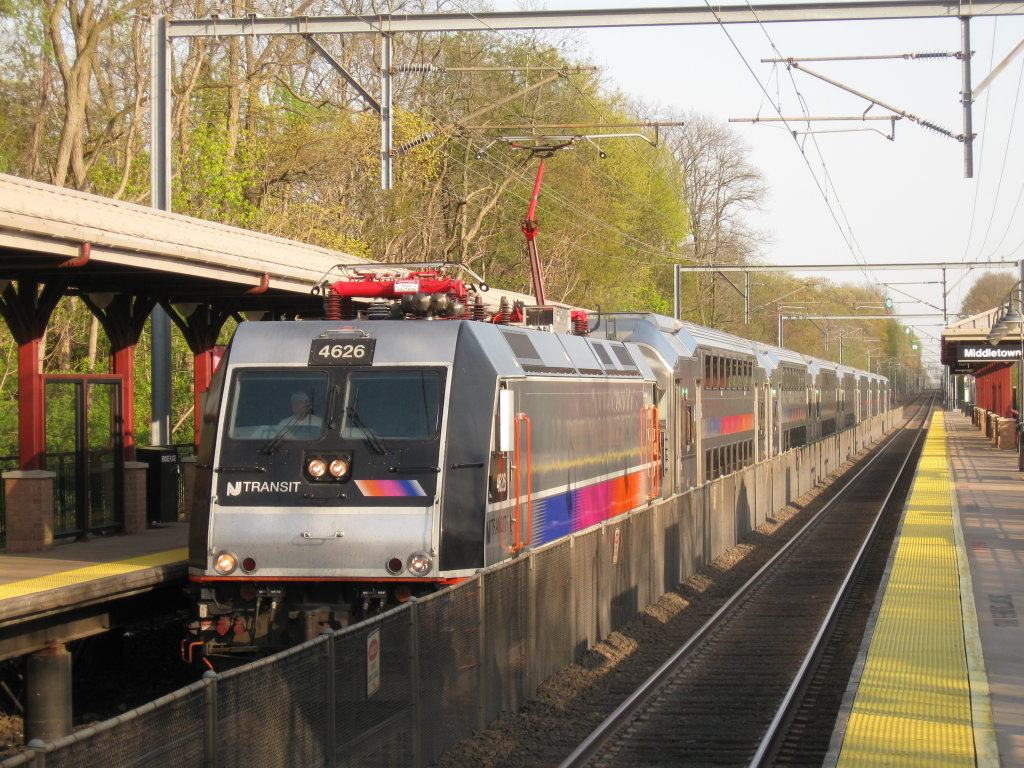
Train approaching Middletown station

NJ Transit provides rail service at the Middletown station. Commuter service runs between New York Penn Station and Bay Head on the North Jersey Coast Line.

NJ Transit offers local bus service on the 817, 833 and 834 routes.

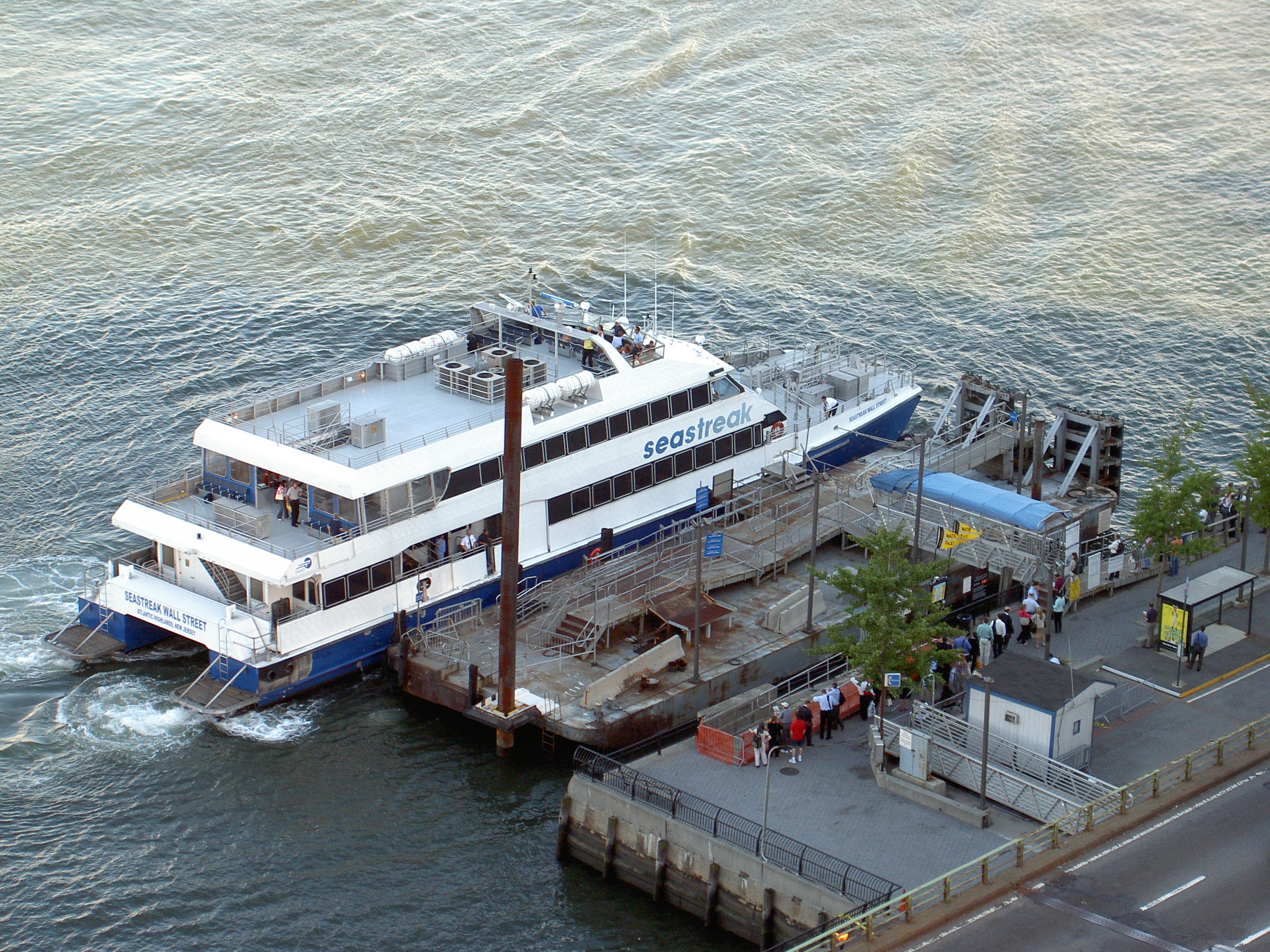
SeaStreak Wall Street docked at the East 34th Street Ferry Landing

Ferry service to and from New York City is available through the NY Waterway. The ferry slip is located in the neighborhood of Belford and is utilized by many Middletown residents for commuting to New York City. The roughly 50 minute trip on the ferry to West Midtown Ferry Terminal travels across the Lower New York Bay to enter Lower New York Harbor at The Narrows.

SeaStreak is another local ferry service, with its ferry slip in neighboring Highlands. SeaStreak offers ferry service to and from New York City with trips to Pier 11 (on the East River at Wall Street) and East 35th Street in Manhattan. The ferry service also offers seasonal travel, such as to the public beaches on Sandy Hook, baseball games at Yankee Stadium and Citi Field, trips to Broadway matinees, Martha's Vineyard in Massachusetts, college football games at West Point, fall foliage in the Hudson Valley, and to the Macy's Thanksgiving Day Parade, among other excursions.

=== Healthcare ===
Hackensack Meridian Health has two hospitals in the area. Bayshore Medical Center in neighboring Holmdel and Riverview Medical Center in neighboring Red Bank. These are local hospitals for the Raritan Bayshore Region and handles all but trauma cases. The closest major university hospitals to the area that handle trauma care are, Jersey Shore University Medical Center in nearby Neptune and Robert Wood Johnson University Hospital in nearby New Brunswick.

Memorial Sloan Kettering Cancer Center, founded in New York City in 1884, has a regional center for Monmouth County located in Middletown. The Memorial Sloan Kettering Cancer Center of Monmouth is the first center outside of the main center in Manhattan to offer outpatient surgery.

== In popular culture ==
The progressive metal band Symphony X was formed in Middletown Township in the mid-1990s.

Kevin Smith wrote and filmed Clerks at a Quick Stop in the Leonardo section of the township.

== Notable people ==
People who were born in, are residents of, or otherwise closely associated with Middletown Township include:

- Mary Kay Adams (born 1962), actress on Babylon 5
- Joseph Azzolina (1926–2010), served in the New Jersey General Assembly 1966–1972, 1986–1988, and 1992–2006
- Sebastian Bach (born 1968), heavy metal singer
- Howard Barbieri (born 1987), former American football guard
- Virginia Bauer (born 1956), advocate for families of the victims of the September 11 terror attacks who is a Commissioner of the Port Authority of New York and New Jersey
- Alyssa Beckerman (born 1981), former gymnast and balance beam national champion
- Jon Bon Jovi (born 1962), musician
- Jake Bongiovi (born 2002), actor, son of Jon Bon Jovi
- Vinnie Brand (born 1963), comedian
- Nicole Byer (born 1986), comedian
- Shilique Calhoun (born 1992), NFL defensive end
- Pete Capella (born 1977), voice actor and comedian
- Connie Chung (born 1946), TV journalist
- Josh Cohen (born 2001), college basketball player for the USC Trojans
- Gary Cuozzo (born 1941), former quarterback who played in the NFL for the Baltimore Colts, New Orleans Saints, Minnesota Vikings and St. Louis Cardinals
- James Dale (born 1970), gay rights activist best known for his role in Boy Scouts of America v. Dale, the landmark US Supreme Court case challenging the BSA's policy of excluding homosexuals from being scout leaders
- Donald De Lue (1897–1988), sculptor
- Billy Devaney (born 1955), general manager of the St. Louis Rams
- Peter Dobson (born 1964), actor who had a cameo role in Forrest Gump as Elvis Presley
- Dean Ehehalt (born 1964), head coach of the Monmouth Hawks baseball team
- Siobhan Fallon Hogan (born 1961), former Saturday Night Live cast member
- Vincent Favale (born 1959), co-founder of Comedy Central
- Darren Fenster (born 1978), manager in the Boston Red Sox minor league system
- John P. Gallagher (1932–2011), politician who served in the New Jersey Senate from the 13th Legislative District 1982–1984
- Amy Handlin (born 1956), represents the 13th Legislative District in the New Jersey General Assembly
- Tom Hanson (1907–1970), football halfback in the National Football League, mainly for the Philadelphia Eagles, for whom he caught the first touchdown in franchise history
- Robert Harper (1951–2020), stage, film and television actor
- Judith Rich Harris (1938–2018), psychologist and author of The Nurture Assumption
- Debbie Harry (born 1945), singer-songwriter and actress, lead singer of the band Blondie
- Josh Heald (born 1977), screenwriter, director, and producer best known for his work on Cobra Kai and Hot Tub Time Machine
- Jerry Holbert (1958–2022), editorial cartoonist
- Kristopher Jansma, fiction writer and essayist
- Ed Jones (born 1952), former defensive back for the Edmonton Eskimos of the Canadian Football League 1976–1984, who won five Grey Cups for the Eskimos and was a CFL All-Star 1979–1981
- Bill Kunkel (1936–1985), former Major League Baseball pitcher and umpire
- Jeff Kunkel (born 1961), former major-league shortstop
- Joe Kyrillos (born 1960), politician who served in the New Jersey Senate 1992–2018, where he represented the 13th Legislative District, and in the General Assembly 1988–1992
- Mike Largey (born 1960), former professional basketball player who played power forward for Hapoel Tel Aviv B.C. of the Israeli Basketball Premier League 1984–1987
- Jack Lawless (born 1987), musician who has been the drummer for the bands DNCE and Ocean Grove, as well as a live drummer for the Jonas Brothers
- Rick Lovato (born 1992), long snapper for the Philadelphia Eagles of the National Football League
- Brian Lynch (born 1973), writer and director of films including Big Helium Dog
- Raymond P. Martinez, Administrator of the Federal Motor Carrier Safety Administration
- Ryan McCormick (born 1991), professional golfer who plays on the PGA Tour
- Melanie McGuire (born 1972, née Slate), convicted of murder
- Knowshon Moreno (born 1987), former Miami Dolphins running back and 1st round draft choice of the Denver Broncos
- Michael Mulheren, actor
- Phil Murphy (born 1957), financier, diplomat and Governor of New Jersey following the 2017 gubernatorial election
- Tammy Murphy (born 1965), First Lady of New Jersey
- Olivia Nuzzi (born 1993), political journalist
- Christian Peter (born 1972), former NFL defensive tackle
- Jason Peter (born 1974), former NFL football player
- Maury Povich (born 1939), talk show personality
- Geraldo Rivera (born 1943), television journalist
- Richard Scudder (1913–2012), newspaper pioneer and co-founder of the MediaNews Group
- Kevin Smith (born 1970), filmmaker whose films include Clerks, Chasing Amy and Jersey Girl
- Jon Stewart (born 1962) comedian, writer, producer, director, actor, media critic and host of The Daily Show
- Penelope Stout (1622–1732), shipwrecked on Sandy Hook in 1640s and was a founder of Middletown
- William Strickland (1788–1854), pioneering architect and civil engineer
- E.W. Swackhamer (1927–1994), television director
- George A. Tice (1938–2025), photographer, known for his images of people and places in New Jersey
- Bob Tucker (born 1945), former tight end in the NFL for the New York Giants and Minnesota Vikings
- James van Riemsdyk (born 1989), professional hockey player for the Detroit Red Wings
- Trevor van Riemsdyk (born 1991), professional hockey player
- Billy Van Zandt (born 1957), actor/playwright
- Steven Van Zandt (born 1950), solo rocker, guitarist for Bruce Springsteen's E Street Band and actor on The Sopranos
- Claudia Vázquez (born 1990), footballer who has played as forward and midfielder for the Puerto Rico women's national football team
- Luke Wafle, college football defensive end for the USC Trojans
- Bill Weber (1957–2024), NBC sports broadcaster
- Jay Weinberg (born 1990), drummer for heavy metal band Slipknot, son of Max Weinberg
- Max Weinberg (born 1951), Late Night with Conan O'Brien band leader and drummer of Bruce Springsteen's E Street Band
- Tom Wilkens (born 1975), Olympic swimming medalist
- Brian Williams (born 1959), Chief Breaking News Anchor on MSNBC, former anchor and managing editor of NBC Nightly News
