= East Keansburg, New Jersey =

Populated place in Monmouth County, New Jersey, US

- Unincorporated community
- Location in Monmouth County. Inset: Location of county within the state of New Jersey East Keansburg (New Jersey) East Keansburg (the United States)
- Coordinates: 40°26′20″N 74°07′01″W
- Country: United States
- State: New Jersey
- County: Monmouth
- Township: Middletown
- Elevation: 7 ft (2.1 m)
- GNIS feature ID: 882449

East Keansburg is an unincorporated community located within Middletown Township in Monmouth County, in the U.S. state of New Jersey. As the name suggests, the area is east of Keansburg with Route 36 bordering the south, Port Monmouth to the east across Pews Creek, and the Raritan Bay to the north. The community is included in the North Middletown portion of the township.

East Keansburg is surrounded by an earthen levee (known as "the dike") constructed as protection against flooding, during large storms such as Hurricane Sandy.

The community includes the Tonya Keller Community Center, McMahon Park, and Ideal Beach along the bay. East Keansburg Fire Company #1 and Middletown Township First Aid & Rescue Squad are both located in East Keansburg. Portions of the Keansburg High School grounds are in Middletown/East Keansburg.
