= New Jersey Women's Heritage Trail =

Collaborative effort to promote women's history

The New Jersey Women's Heritage Trail is a collaborative effort between the New Jersey's Historic Preservation Office, part of the New Jersey Department of Environmental Protection, and 94 historic sites statewide to raise awareness about the roles played by women in shaping the history of state of New Jersey.

Described by The Township Journal as the "nation's first comprehensive survey of women's historic sites", the statewide educational initiative had its genesis in the nation's first annual conference to explore ways to raise awareness regarding the role that women have played in the nation's history. Held in Bryn Mawr, Pennsylvania in 1994, that conference was presented collaboratively by the state's Historic Preservation Office, the Alice Paul Centennial Foundation, and Preservation New Jersey. It helped pave the way for New Jersey's passage of legislation in 1999 which authorized funding "to begin research to identify historic sites associated with New Jersey women."

== Sites ==
As of 2018, more than 90 sites are included related to:

- Acorn Hall, Women of the Crane–Hone Family
- Alice Stokes Paul's childhood home
- Annis Boudinot Stockton, a Colonial era poet
- Atlantic City Convention Hall where Miss America Pageants have taken place
- Clara Barton, a Civil War era nurse and the founder of the first public school in New Jersey
- Alice Paul, suffragist
- Anne Morrow Lindbergh
- Millicent Fenwick, political leader
- Home of abolitionist Quaker Abigail Goodwin and her sister Elizabeth who helped and housed runaway slaves along on the Underground Railroad and organized with other leading abolitionists.
- Rebecca Estell Bourgeois Winston
- Women's Federation Memorial at Palisades Interstate Park
- The Victor building of the Victor Talking Machine Company where women worked at 1 Market Street, between Delaware and Front Streets
- Bridget Smith House at 124 Randolph Avenue in Morris County, Mine Hill Township where Irish immigrant wives and families lived after their husbands were killed in mines
- Brookdale Farm in Thompson Park, 805 Newman Springs Road, Lincroft, where social welfare reformer Geraldine Morgan Thompson (1872–1967) lived
- Martha Brookes Hutcheson's gardens at what is now Bamboo Brook Outdoor Education Center
- Sara Spencer Washington's Hotel Brigantine
- Roosevelt Common designed by Marjorie Sewell Cautley
- Esther Saunders burial site at Salem Friends Burial Ground
- Smithville Park in Easthampton, New Jersey where Agnes Gilkerson (1838–1881) was involved in the development of worker's village Smithville and edited a newspaper
- Jarena Lee's gravesite at Mt. Pisgah Church
- Elizabeth Cady Stanton House
- Mary Teresa Norton House where Mary Teresa Norton lived when she became the first woman elected to the U.S. Congress
- Whitesbog Village where Elizabeth Coleman White developed blueberry plants for the commercial trade
- Rockingham preserved by the work of Josephine Swann and Kate McFarlane
- Mary Catherine Phillips's contributions to Consumers' Research, Bowerstown
- Plainfield Garden Club's care for the Shakespeare Garden at Cedar Brook Park
- James and Ann Whitall House where Ann Cooper Whitall aided soldiers after the Battle of Red Bank

== See also ==
- List of women's organizations
- Women's history
