= Ruth Morgan =

American peace activist

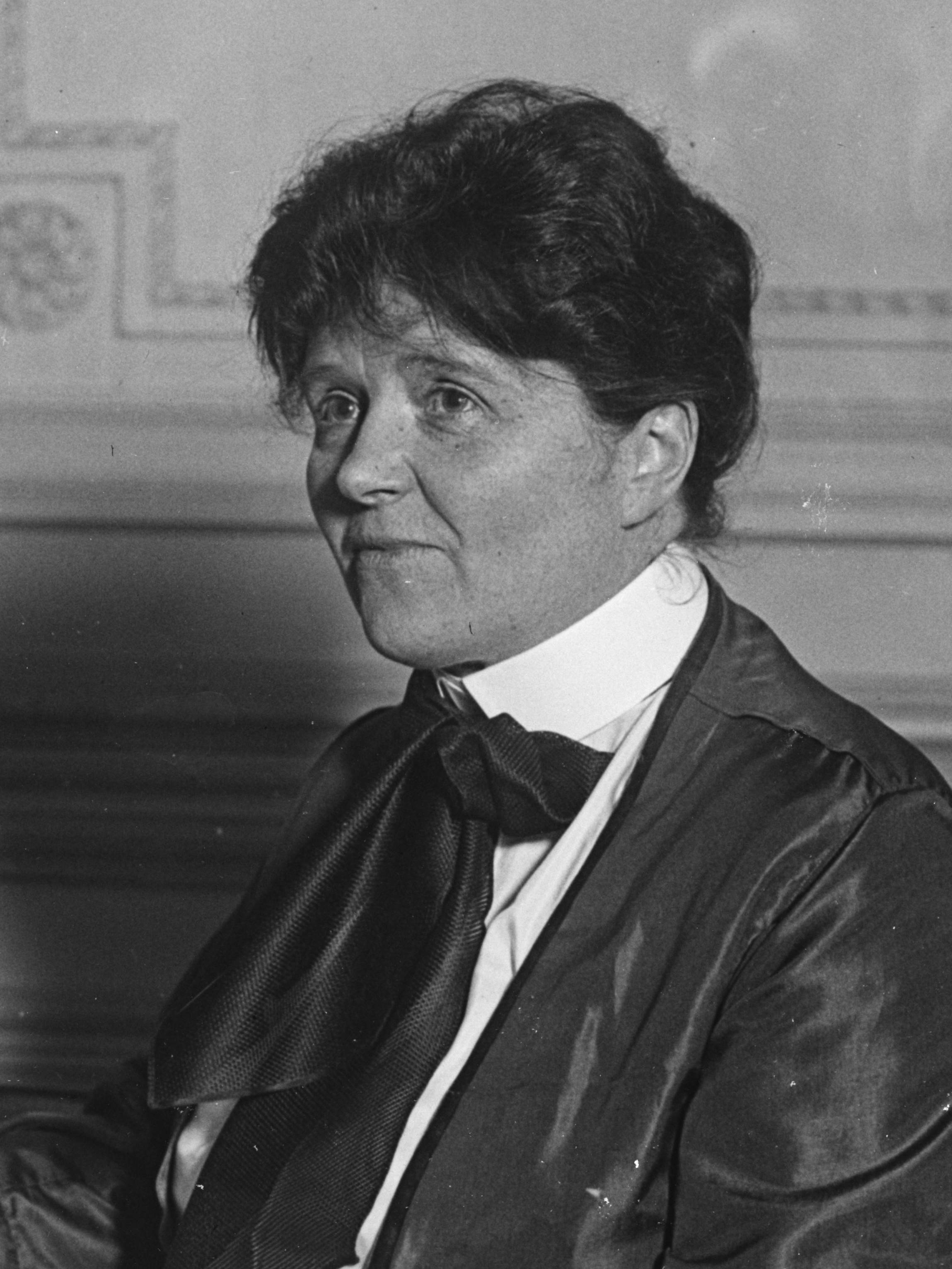
- Ruth Morgan, Paris, September 1918
- Born: October 12, 1870; Staatsburg, New York, United States
- Died: March 11, 1934 (aged 63); Manhattan, New York City, New York, United States
- Occupations: Women's suffrage and peace activist
- Years active: 1900 – 1934
- Known for: American Red Cross high commissioner (World War I); Chair, National League of Women Voters' Department of International Cooperation for the Prevention of War (1920s); Chair, Women's Council on the Limitation of Armaments, Washington Naval Conference (1921-1922)

Ruth Morgan (October 12, 1870 – March 11, 1934) was an American peace activist during the late nineteenth and early twentieth centuries.

Working as a manager at Bellevue Hospital in New York City during the early 1900s, she was placed in charge of the Bureau of Hospital Services operated by the American Red Cross in France during World War I. Evaluating the nursing care and social needs of the soldiers serving with the American Expeditionary Forces upon her arrival, she quickly determined that significant improvements were needed and established "Flying Squadrons" of nurses "to be sent 'flying' over France in motor cars to each mobile, evacuation or military hospital where any American soldiers, brigaded with the French, had been sent." Equipped with food and medicine for the soldiers, they also frequently served as translators between the soldiers and their French physicians since many of the Americans they were assisting did not speak French.

Deeply affected by what she witnessed in France during that war, she rose to international prominence through her appointments during the 1920s to leadership positions with national and international advocacy organizations, including the League of Nations. Speaking to a gathering of women in 1925 as chair of the National League of Women Voters' committee on international cooperation, Morgan said:

"Our destinies are in our own hands.... If war goes on, it will be our own fault. We can no longer be deluded by the idea that such catastrophes are matters of fate. The establishment of peace is the responsibility of every woman in this room."

== Formative years and family ==
Born in Staatsburg, New York on October 12, 1870, Ruth Morgan was a daughter of William Dare Morgan (1838-1887) and Angelica Livingston Hoyt (1847-1933) and the sister of suffragists and social reformers Geraldine Morgan Thompson (1872-1967) and Margaret Lewis Morgan Norrie (1869-1927), the latter of whom was the eldest of the Morgan sisters and eponym of the Margaret Lewis Norrie State Park in Dutchess County, New York. Their younger brother, journalist Gerald Morgan Sr. (1879-1948), reported on the Nazi invasion of Belgium for the New York Tribune during World War II.

Grandchildren of Morgan Lewis, the third governor of the State of New York who was a son of Francis Lewis, a signer of the United States Declaration of Independence, Margaret, Ruth, Geraldine, and Gerald Morgan grew up to become prominent members of society and civic leaders in their own right. Ruth Morgan received a private education at home through a governess hired by her parents, who were members of the Episcopal Church. When she was old enough to travel, she was sent for further education to the Convent of the Sacred Heart in Tours, France.

As young women, Ruth and Margaret Morgan joined the Colony Club during its first years of operation, and actively helped to recruit Eleanor Roosevelt and suffragist and conservationist Rosalie Edge as new members to the club during the early 1900s.

== Hospital career and activism ==
Employed as a manager at Bellevue Hospital in New York City, beginning sometime around 1905, Ruth Morgan continued to work in that capacity into the mid-1920s, dividing her residency time between her hometown of Staatsburg and Washington Square in the city. In 1917, she was appointed by New York City Mayor John Purroy Mitchel to chair the Cooperative Committee of Women on Defense.

During World War I, she was appointed as a high commissioner for the American Red Cross and served in France. She is credited with the planning and implementation of "Flying Squadrons" of nurses who transported food and medicine by automobile to "mobile, evacuation or military hospital[s] where any American soldiers, brigaded with the French, had been sent." Observed Morgan:

"Wounded and dying American soldiers were being placed in hospitals which were strange to them, and where they were not understood. Our men could not speak French. The French staffs could not talk English. Something had to be done. No one but the patients themselves will ever fully realize the tonic these women were…. Men who had gone over the top, who had become unconscious on the battle ground and were carried into a French hospital, woke out of their sick faint fearing they had been taken prisoner by the Germans. When they found they could not understand the language, they were sure they had been trapped…. When the flying squadrons reassured soldiers, they relieved the French physicians' curative task."

During the 1920s, Morgan chaired the National League of Women Voters' department of international cooperation for the prevention of war. Among the agencies and initiatives supported during her tenure were the World Court in 1924 and the Kellogg-Briand Pact in 1928.

In 1921, she chaired the Women's Council on the Limitation of Armaments, which was held in Washington, D.C. from November 12, 1921, to February 6, 1922, as part of the Washington Naval Conference that resulted in the signing of the Washington Naval Treaty.

On April 19, 1922, Morgan presented the opening remarks at a highly publicized New York City League of Women Voters' event, during which she introduced Viscountess Nancy Witcher Langhorne Astor, the American-born, British politician who had become the first woman to be seated as a Member of Parliament in the United Kingdom. Lady Astor, who had returned to America to participate as a delegate to the Pan-American Conference of Women in Baltimore, Maryland from April 20 to 29, gave a pre-conference address to the New York audience, which included Carrie Chapman Catt and other leading women's rights activists, as well as Morgan's fellow Colony Club members, civic leaders and prominent members of society.

In early 1925, Morgan participated in the League of Nations Conference in Geneva, Switzerland. In 1926, she chaired the International Alliance of Women's committee for peace and a League of Nations committee in Geneva.

In 1932, she was one of six hundred women who participated as delegates to the five-day National League of Women Voters' convention in Detroit, Michigan. These delegates were appointed and authorized "to decide the participation in government...attempted during the next two years by their constituent State or local leagues in forty-two States, the District of Columbia and Hawaii."

== Illness, death and interment ==
Morgan fell ill after chairing a conference hosted by the National Committee on the Cause and Cure of War in Washington, D.C. in January 1934. She died at the age of sixty-three at her home in Manhattan on March 11, 1934. Following funeral services at Grace Episcopal Church in Manhattan on March 13, which were attended by her family and friends, including U.S. Secretary of Labor Frances Perkins and Sara Roosevelt, the mother of U.S. President Franklin D. Roosevelt, Morgan was interred in the Morgan family's mausoleum at the Saint James Episcopal Churchyard in Hyde Park, New York.

== Social and political affiliations ==
Morgan was a member of multiple political and social organizations during her lifetime, including the:

- Colony Club (member and president); and
- League of Women Voters (third and first vice president).

== See also ==
- List of civil rights leaders
- List of feminists
- List of women's rights activists
