= John Hendricks House and Dutch Barn =

Historic house in New York, United States

- U.S. National Register of Historic Places
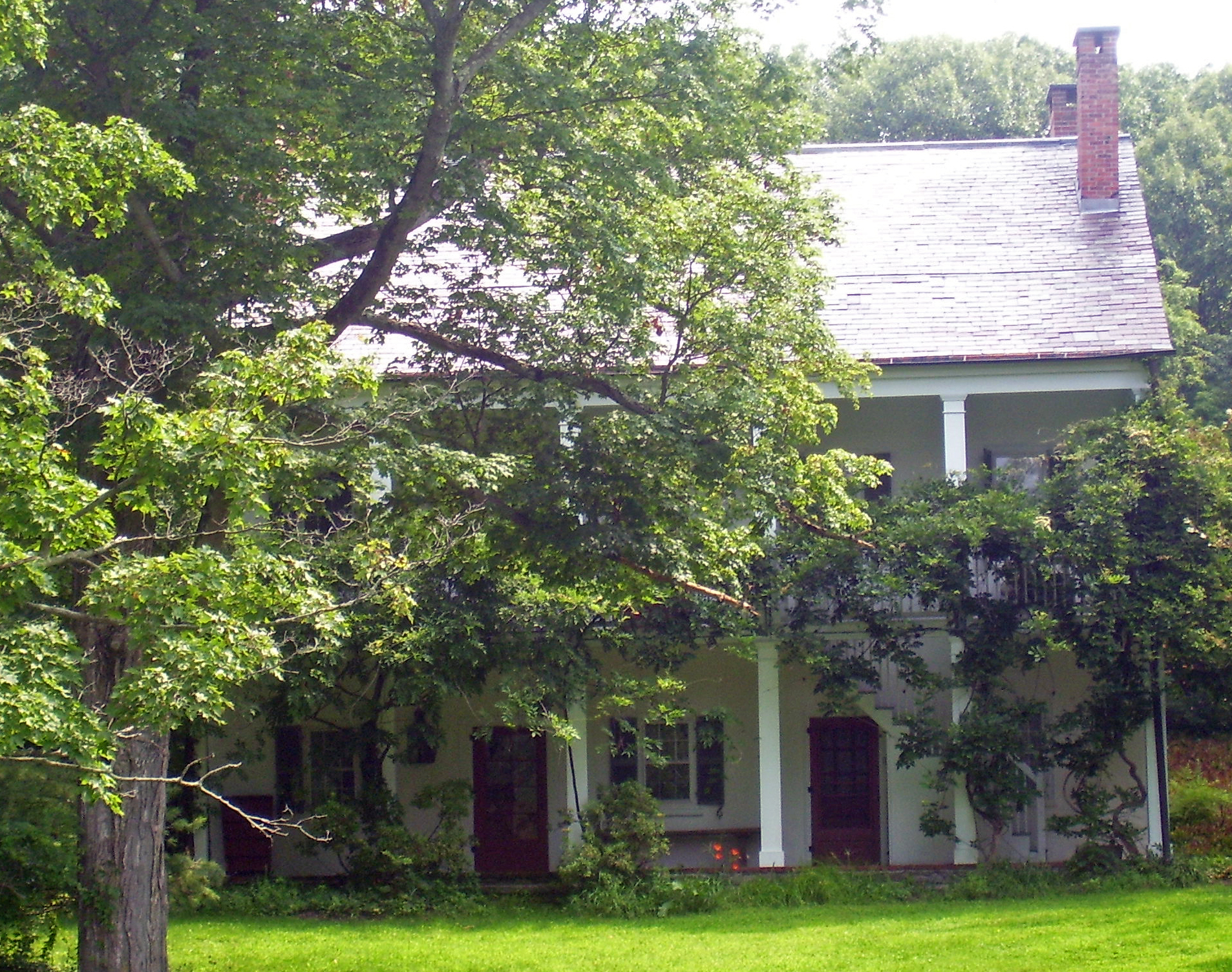
- West elevation of house, 2008
- Location: Staatsburg, NY
- Nearest city: Poughkeepsie
- Coordinates: 41°50′34″N 73°55′45″W
- Area: 30 acres (12 ha)
- Built: 1785
- NRHP reference No.: 84002373
- Added to NRHP: September 7, 1984

The John Hendricks House and Dutch Barn is located along Old Post Road in Staatsburg, New York. It is a late-18th-century stone house that once served as an inn along the Albany Post Road.

A Dutch barn on the property also dates to that era. It underwent a number of renovations and additions in the Picturesque mode in the 19th century. The house was restored to its original appearance in the late 20th century. In 1984 it was listed on the National Register of Historic Places.

== Property ==
The two buildings are located near the west boundary of a wedge-shaped 30-acre (12 ha) lot between Old Post Road, US 9 and Hughes Avenue. Its west (front) facade is opposite Margaret Lewis Norrie State Park. The barn is located just to its southeast. The only other building on the property is a house on Hughes. It is modern and considered non-contributing.

The house itself is built into a gentle slope. It is a rectangular building, five bays wide by two stories tall. The west and south sides (visible from the road) are faced in stucco; the other two retain their original fieldstone. It is topped with a gabled roof from which four brick chimneys rise.

The west elevation features a two-story porch supported by six pillars. Its upper story has a balustrade. All doors and windows have simple wood trim. On the east is a partially enclosed one-story frame wing. Its southern three bays have a porch with a miter-arched frieze and square columns.

Inside the house has many original finishings, including its flooring and Federal mantels. The center-hall floor plan remains intact, with some features suggesting early use as an inn. The main room is divided by what appears to be a bar, and the north room contains some aspects of the original beehive oven.

To the southeast of the house is the Dutch barn. It retains its original 18th-century form but has had some later additions, such as cross-gabling, a hip-roofed cupola, board-and-batten siding and quatrefoil windows. Small oculi are located in the gable apexes, and a similarly sided and fenestrated frame wing extends from the southwest corner.

== History ==
Hendricks bought the property and built the house around 1785, when the Pawling Patent was first subdivided. Local tradition holds that it was an inn for travelers using the Albany Post Road, and the layout of the first floor provides some support for this.

On Hendricks' death in 1815, the property was acquired by George Lamoree, a major speculator in land in the area during the early 19th century. At the time it was over 90 acres (36 ha). His heirs sold the property to William Dinsmore in 1884. He added it to his large estate and remodeled the barn to match those at his main farm complex further north.

By the mid-20th century the house had become vacant. A succession of owners in the century's later decades restored it to its original appearance.
