= Esopus Island =

Island in New York, United States

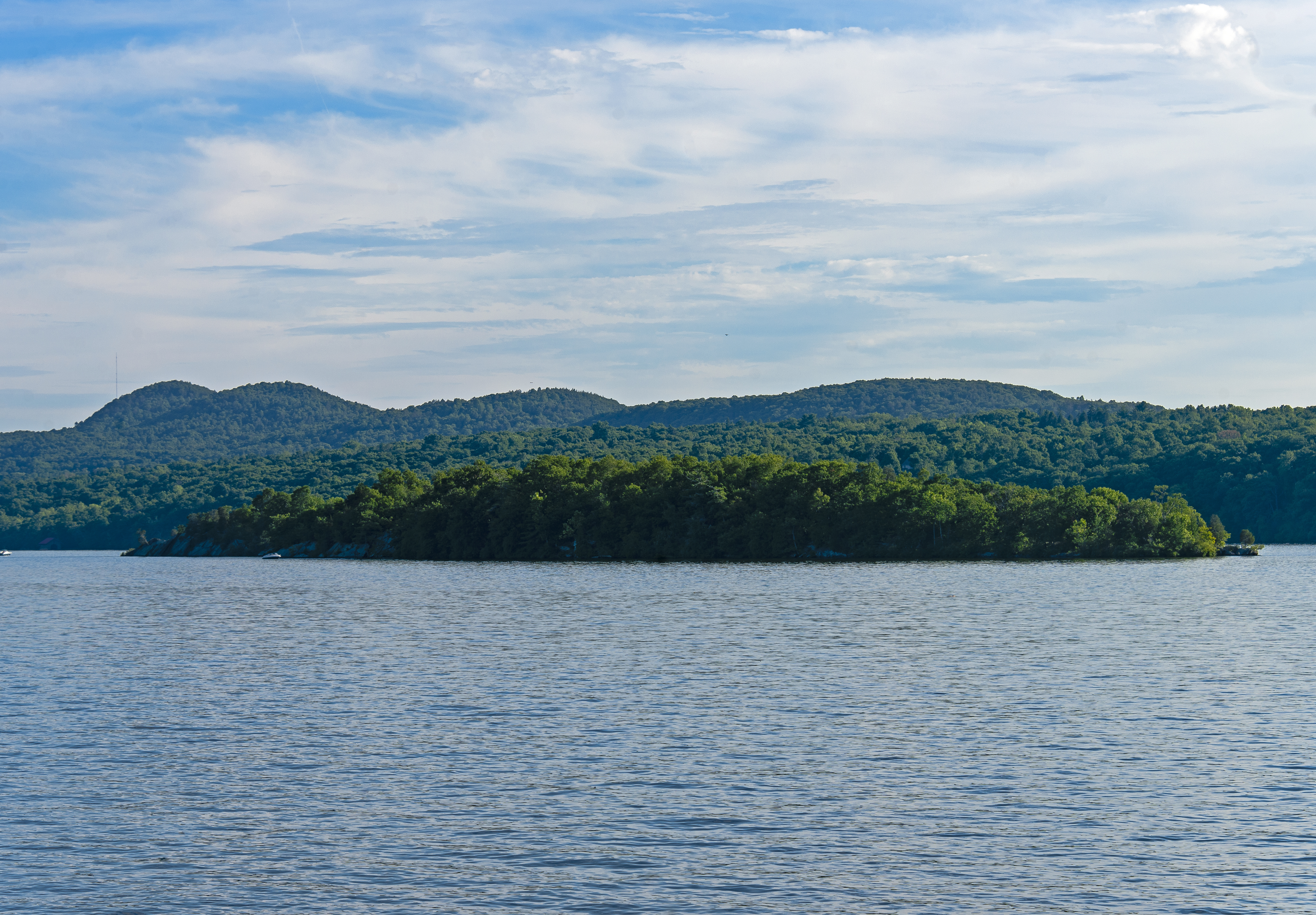
- Esopus Island from the Mills Norrie State Park marina in Staatsburg
- Interactive map of Esopus Island
- Etymology: Esopus tribe of the Lenape Indian nation

Geography
- Location: Staatsburg, NY
- Coordinates: 41.825340°N 73.947425°W
- Adjacent to: Hudson River
- Total islands: 1
- Length: 1,500 ft (460 m)
- Width: 120 ft (37 m)

Esopus Island is an uninhabited island in the Hudson River. It is part of Margaret Lewis Norrie State Park, located in the town of Hyde Park in Dutchess County, in the state of New York.

== Geography ==
The island is located to the east of the center of the river channel, 84 miles (135 km) north of the river's mouth at New York City, roughly 1,200 feet (370 m) offshore, southwest of Norrie Point in Staatsburg, and opposite the mouth of Black Creek in the town of Esopus on the west shore. It is approximately 1,500 feet (460 m) long. In an 1894 book its shape was compared to "a great stranded and petrified whale". There is a beach on the southeast side and shoals at the north end. The island is wooded with outcrops of rock. It is part of Margaret Lewis Norrie State Park and of the Hudson River Watertrail and has campsites, picnic areas, trails, and fishing access points, but can be reached only by boat.

To the south of the island is the much smaller Bolles Island, which is private property with a residence.

== History ==
The Lenape Indians are presumed to have made use of the island, and a stone on the east shore shows signs of human working, resembling a megalith. There is a legend of a Jesuit missionary killed on the island by the Indians.

In October 1777, during the Revolutionary War, a British fleet laid off Esopus Island prior to destroying Kingston, then the provincial capital.

In the second half of the 19th century the island was part of the estate of Robert Livingston Pell and was known as Pell Island.

Aleister Crowley spent 40 days and 40 nights on Esopus Island (which he spelled "Oesopus") in 1918, translating the Tao Te Ching, meditating, and painting slogans on the rocks with red paint. Friends had given him money to buy a tent, a canoe, and stores for his retreat to the island, but instead of food he bought the paint, brushes, and rope for rappeling, saying that he would be "fed by ravens". Local people as well as friends brought him supplies.

It was illegal to camp on the island until it was incorporated into the New York State parks system.

== In popular culture ==
Esopus Island is featured prominently in the novel Piper Houdini: Nightmare on Esopus Island, in which Aleister Crowley returns to the island in 1926 to complete the ritual workings he began in 1918.
