= Poughkeepsie Yacht Club =

Yacht club in New York, United States

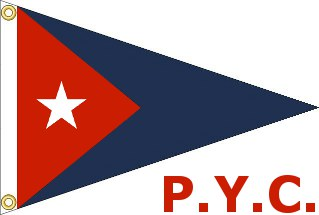
- Burgee
- Short name: PYC
- Founded: 1892
- Location: Staatsburg, New York
- Allen White
- Website: www.poughkeepsieyachtclub.org

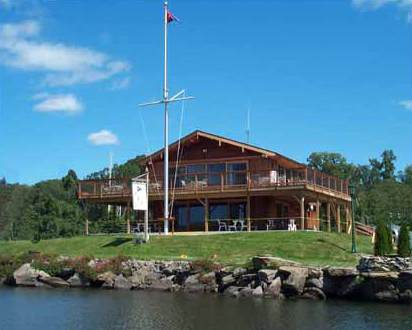
Clubhouse

The Poughkeepsie Yacht Club (PYC) is a small private yacht club based in the Hudson River Valley in upstate New York, United States. The club was founded in 1892, and is one of the earliest yachting institutions in America. It is located on the eastern shore in the heart of the Hudson Valley, on a part of the Hudson River about halfway between New York City and Albany. It is near the Hyde Park historic sites and the town of Rhinebeck.

Club officers include a commodore, vice-commodore, rear-commodore, measurer, secretary, and treasurer.

== History ==
The Poughkeepsie Yacht Club was founded in 1892 by a small group of working sailors and yachtsmen.

It now has approximately 120 "active" (boat owning) and "social" (non-boat owning) members.

During the early years of the club, rowing played an important role in fostering interest and membership. This led to negotiations securing the first race of the "University Eights" (Intercollegiate Regatta) in June 1895. In addition to racing, yachting, and rowing, iceboating was popular with club members as well. The club field had as many as seven ice yachts, generally storing four in the boat house.

Traditionally the Poughkeepsie Yacht Club has been a "working club," where members take part in maintaining the club facilities and grounds. Participation hours include activities such as the "all hands on deck" docks in and docks out, as well as working on the annual events hosted at the club. Members may join committees relating to docks, membership, house, grounds, moorings, and entertainment.

=== Clubhouses ===
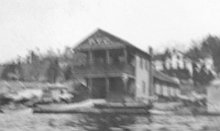
Original 1892 clubhouse

In 1892, the club's first clubhouse was established in a modest building in Poughkeepsie, New York, on what is now the waterfront of lower Main Street. The club leased a dock known as the "Sand Dock" from the New York Central and Hudson River Railroad company at a rate of $25 per year. The first clubhouse was built by May of the following year. It was located on the site of the old Revolutionary Ship Yard (or Continental Shipyard) at Ship Yard Point, now known as Fox's Point in Poughkeepsie. The first clubhouse was a wooden structure twenty by twenty feet, and two stories high. With money in short supply, unusual fundraising methods were employed. In 1897, the veranda in front of the house was added using the proceeds of the "Autumn Carnival". The club has always been a "working man's club", and today aims to uphold the humble tradition.

In 1905, the club's second clubhouse was erected at a new location. The club largely had an untroubled history until the fall of 1904, when they had to move due to a land deal. After a great deal of effort and negotiation, a deal was made just south of the present Mid-Hudson Bridge, at the end of Union Street.

In 1974, the club's third clubhouse was built. Due to frustration with the Poughkeepsie Urban Renewal project, and the lack of land for winter storage and launching, the club moved to its present location in Staatsburg.

The current clubhouse is a two-story building offering an unobstructed panoramic view of the Hudson River from its East shore location. Although the name ("Poughkeepsie") comes from the club's origins in the late 19th century (founded in 1892), it is now located in Staatsburg, on historic Route U.S. 9. Nearby attractions include the Franklin Delano Roosevelt Hyde Park Home, FDR Library and Museum, the Eleanor Roosevelt Home, the Vanderbilt Estate and grounds (including hiking trails), the Ogden Mills Estate, Norrie State Park, and the Culinary Institute of America.

== Commodores ==
Year(s)	Commodore	Year(s)	Commodore
1892–1894	Powell Hobert	1962–1963	Frank Koff
1895	Edward Laufersweiler	1964	William E Murphy, Jr.
1896	James E. Birdsall	1965	James Creighton
1897–1899	William H. Frank	1966	George A. Beutel
1900	Herman Von der Linden	1967	Dr. George T. C. Way
1901	William H. Frank	1968	Richard C. Smith
1902–1903	Frank E. Daubert	1969	Einar D. Reves
1904–1905	Javy Ackert	1970–1971	David A. Harrand
1906	George P. Bogardus	1972–1974	Harold E. Krom
1907–1914	William H. Frank	1975–1976	James C. Clapp
1915–1916	Albert Traver	1977	Wilbur M. Rouse, Jr.
1917	Henry S. White	1978–1979	Robert K. Brown, Sr.
1918–1919	George Saltford	1980–1981	Frank R. Vinciguerra
1920–1922	Albert Traver	1982–1983	Richard E. Martineau
1923	Robert J. Pascoe	1984–1985	Edward A. Feldweg
1924–1929	Alpheus Wright	1986–1987	Cornelius S. Krajewski
1930	Alfred Heyer	1988–1989	Duff M. Neely
1931–1933	Keene Richards	1990–1991	Kenneth A. Sautter
1934	Howard M. Sherwood	1992–1993	Claus Uhl
1935–1937	Philip Mylod	1994–1995	Wiliam F. Washburn
1938–1939	Louis J. Hall	1996–1997	Harold L. Placke
1940	Keene Richards	1998–1999	William J. Spencer
1941–1942	Joseph Davis	2000–2001	Gerald Movall
1943	Dr. Howard P. Carpenter	2002–2003	Clark Henderson
1944	Einar B. Petersen	2004–2005	Mark V. Still
1945	Louis J. Hall	2006–2007	Leathem Mehaffey
1946	Keene Richards	2008–2009	William Fitchett
1947	Clifford F. Andrews	2010–2011	Frank Desiano
1948	Duncan Jago	2012–2013	Mark Jaggi
1949	Carl Fritz	2014–2015	Allen White
1950–1951	Clifford F. Andrews	2016–2017	Morgan (Greg) Smith
1952	Keene Richards	2018–2019	Mark VanDemark
1953	Stanley V. Post	2020–2021	Rudy Colich
1954–1955	Ralph B. DeLano, Jr.		
1956–1957	Stanley V. Post		
1958	Thomas A. Moawood		
1959	Arthur W. Southwick		
1960	Allan C. Miller		
1961	James E. Carroll, Jr.		

== Gallery ==
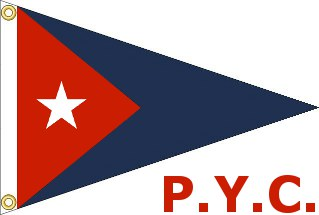
Club Burgee

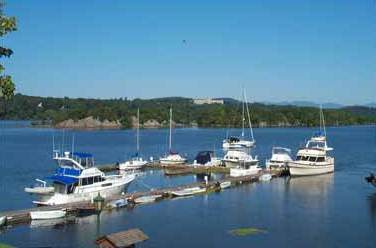
PYC north dock

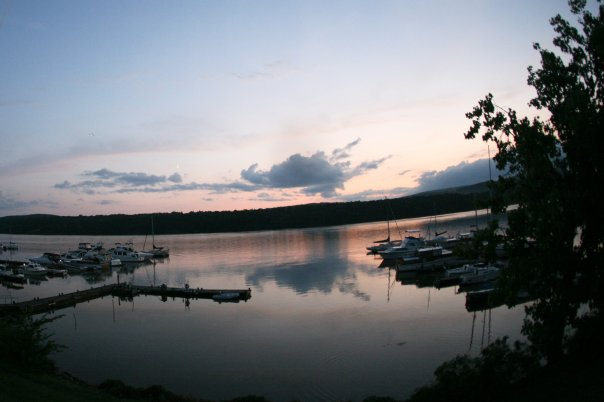
Sunset

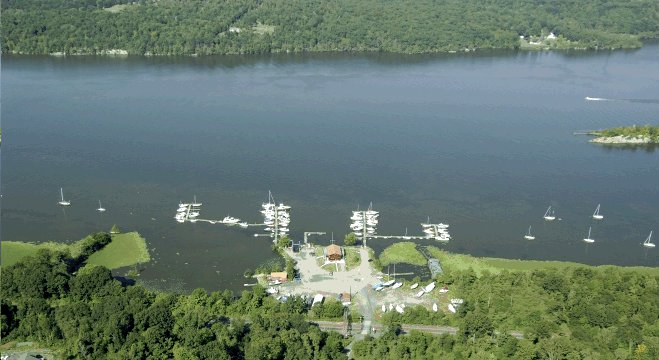
Aerial photo from the 2000s

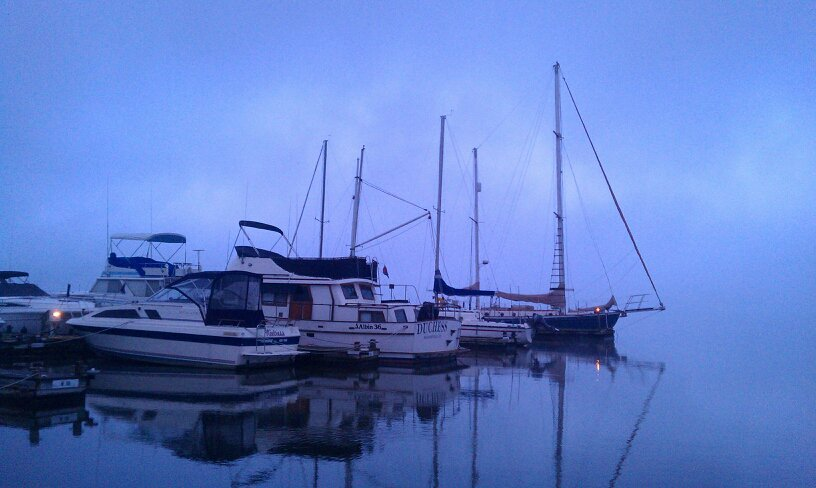
Foggy morning 2011

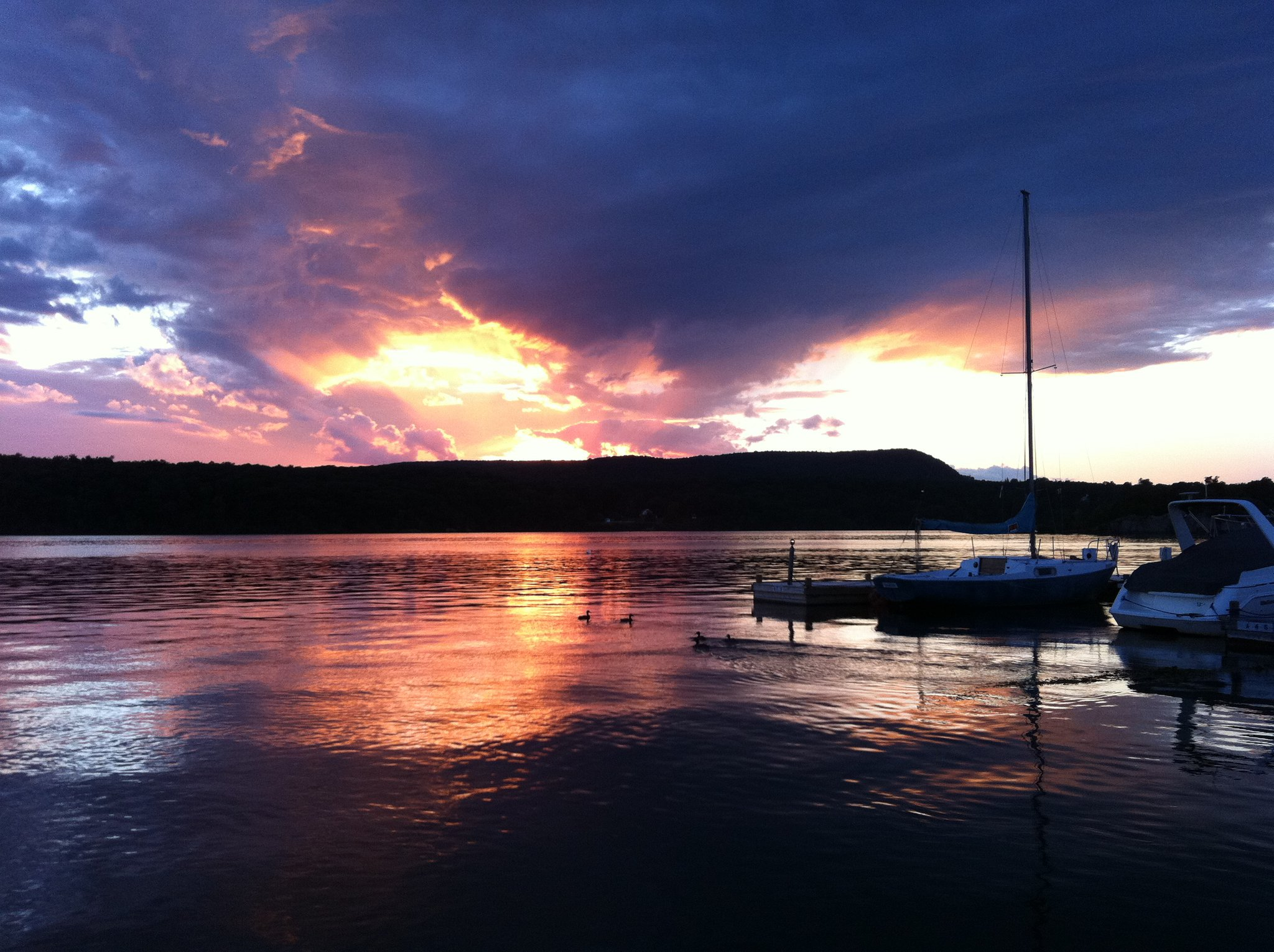
Sunset 2011
