= Ogden Mills & Ruth Livingston Mills State Park =

State park in Dutchess County, New York

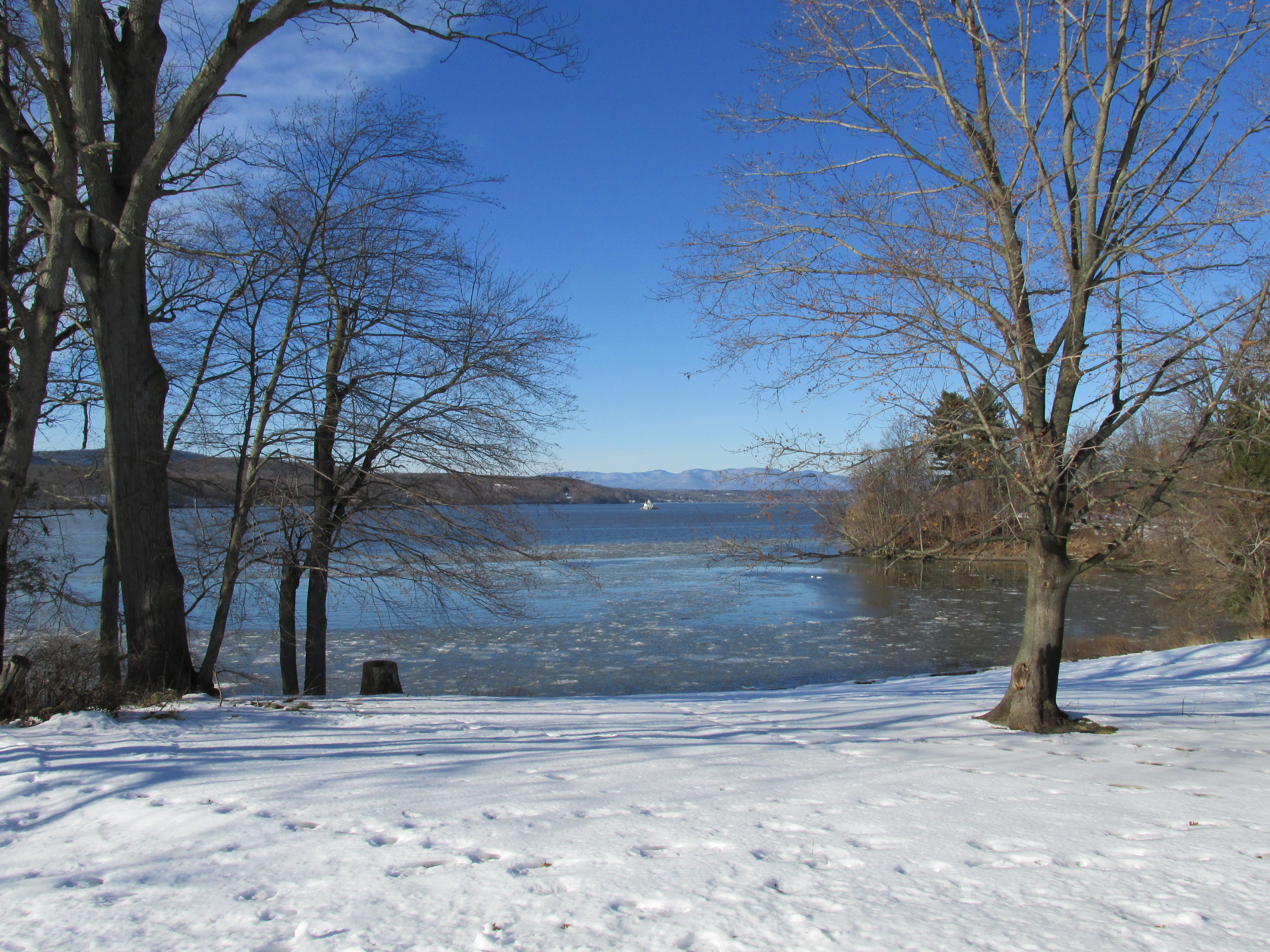
- Hudson River

- Location within New York Location within the United States
- Location: Staatsburg, New York, Dutchess County, New York, United States
- Coordinates: 41°51′11″N 73°55′41″W
- Established: 1937
- Named for: Ogden Livingston Mills
- Governing body: New York State Office of Parks, Recreation and Historic Preservation
- Website: Ogden Mills & Ruth Livingston Mills State Park

Ogden Mills & Ruth Livingston Mills State Park, also known as Mills Memorial State Park, is a 750-acre (3.0 km^{2}) state park located in Staatsburg in Dutchess County, New York. It is off U.S. Route 9, between Rhinebeck to the north and Hyde Park to the south, at an elevation of 39 feet (12 m) above sea level. The park is bounded by the Hudson River on the west.

It is part of the 988-acre (4.00 km^{2}) area known as Mills-Norrie State Park, which comprises Margaret Lewis Norrie State Park and Ogden Mills & Ruth Livingston Mills State Park.

The park's central feature is Staatsburgh State Historic Site, a Beaux-Arts mansion designed by McKim, Mead, and White. Built between 1895 and 1896, the Gilded Age mansion features 65 rooms, 14 bathrooms, and 23 fireplaces. The furnished house is open for tours, programs and special events. Other park features include trails, cabins, tent sites, RV sites, fishing opportunities, picnic area, recreation programs, restaurant, cross-country skiing and sledding.

== Dinsmore golf course ==
The park also features Dinsmore golf course, a public golf course for 9 or 18 holes. A restaurant is available.

LAT: 41.8520456591 LONG: -73.9352416992

== Nearby state parks and historic sites ==
- Margaret Lewis Norrie State Park (Dutchess County)
- Staatsburgh State Historic Site (Dutchess County)
- Clermont State Historic Site (Columbia County)
- Olana State Historic Site (Columbia County)
- Lake Taghkanic State Park (Columbia County)
- James Baird State Park (Dutchess County)

== See also ==
- List of New York state parks
