= Anthony Catanzaro Square =

Square in Brooklyn, New York

Coordinates: 40°35′12″N 73°59′8″W

Anthony Catanzaro Square is located within a traffic triangle that is the result of three street grids that meet in the Bath Beach neighborhood of Brooklyn, New York. At this junction, West 16 Street meets its northern end at the same place where Avenue Y meets its western end, both of these roads meeting Bay 50th Street.

In 1963, the City Council designated this triangle as Anthony Catanzaro Square, in honor of Private First Class Anthony Catanzaro (1916-1943), who was killed in the service of the country during World War II. A son of Italian immigrants, Anthony Catanzaro lived across the street from the triangle. Fighting in the 322nd Fighter Control Squadron, his ship was on its way to the front in Italy when it was torpedoed on November 26, 1943 by German forces. Private First Class Catanzaro was posthumously awarded the Purple Heart medal and buried at the nearby North Africa American Cemetery in Carthage, Tunisia. In this war, his younger brother Joseph (1919-2015) survived the June 6, 1944 invasion of Normandy and returned home vowing to honor Anthony.

Through the efforts of Joseph, a flagpole was installed and shrubs planted at the site, lovingly cared by Joseph who raised the park’s flag each morning.

Anthony Catanzaro Square is part of the Greenstreets program, a partnership between the New York City Parks Department and the city Department of Transportation that transforms unused traffic triangles and medians into green spaces.
