= Brookdale Farm (Lincroft, New Jersey) =

Coordinates: 40.3347°N 74.1452°W

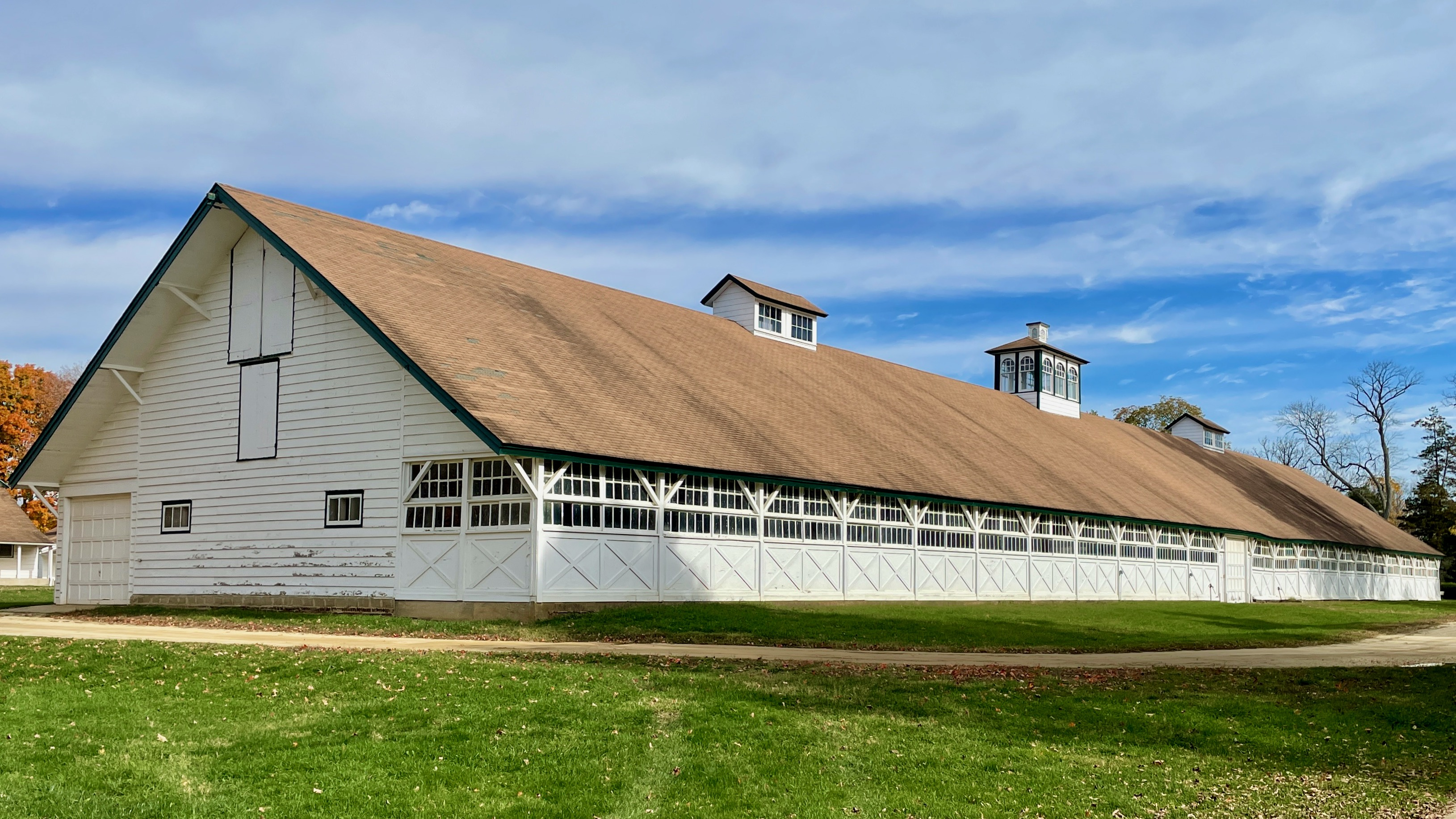
- Training Stable at Brookdale Farm
- Type: Horse breeding stud farm Thoroughbred racing stable
- Industry: Thoroughbred horse racing
- Headquarters: 805 Newman Springs Road; Lincroft, New Jersey
- Key people: David Dunham Withers; Harry Payne Whitney; James G. Rowe Sr.

Brookdale Farm is a former Thoroughbred breeding and training farm located at 805 Newman Springs Road in the Lincroft section of Middletown Township in Monmouth County, New Jersey. Thomas Lloyd acquired the property in the late 18th century. In 1872, David Dunham Withers established the horse breeding and training operation. By 1889, the farm included 838 acres (3.39 km^{2}). In 1968, 215 acres (0.87 km^{2}) of the farm were bequeathed by Geraldine Morgan Thompson to the county to create Thompson Park.

== History ==
In 1774, Thomas Lloyd bought 200 acres (0.81 km^{2}) along the north bank of the Swimming River. By 1786, he had built a large house here. The acreage had increased to 316 acres (1.28 km^{2}) by 1798. After his death in 1812, the property was divided and passed through several owners. In 1872, David Dunham Withers, active in the horse racing industry, bought 200 acres (0.81 km^{2}) for his Brookdale Stable. In 1893, William Payne Thompson purchased the property. His son, Lewis, married Geraldine Morgan Thompson in 1896. They became full owners of the property by 1899.

== Historic district ==
- Brookdale Farm Historic District
- U.S. National Register of Historic Places
- U.S. Historic district
- New Jersey Register of Historic Places
- Area: 228 acres (92 ha)
- NRHP reference No.: 100004105
- NJRHP No.: 3360

Significant dates
- Added to NRHP: November 9, 2020
- Designated NJRHP: May 9, 2019

The Brookdale Farm Historic District is a 228-acre (0.92 km^{2}) historic district encompassing the core part of the farm. It was added to the National Register of Historic Places on November 9, 2020, for its significance in agriculture, architecture and entertainment/recreation from 1786 to 1932. The district has 19 contributing buildings and one contributing site. Thomas Lloyd built his Georgian house in 1786. It was renovated and expanded in Colonial Revival style by Harry Whitney in 1914. The Lloyd Barn was likely built in the 18th century. It was later upgraded by Geraldine Thompson. The two-story Ten Mare Barn was likely built by David Withers in 1883. The two-story, forty-stall Training Stable measures 64 by 296 feet (20 m × 90 m) and is the largest building on the farm. Built starting c. 1879, each section features a gabled cupola.

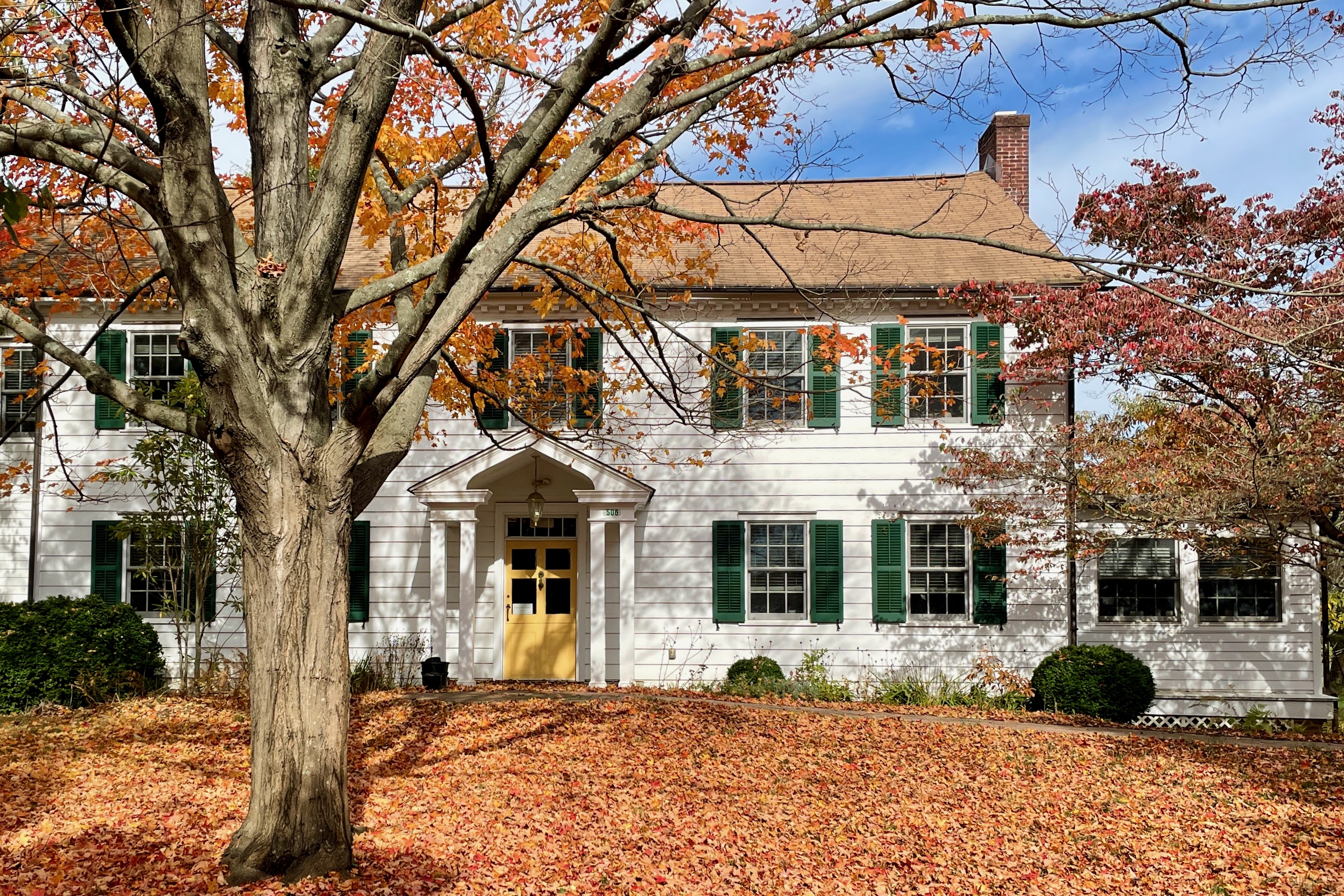
Thomas Lloyd House

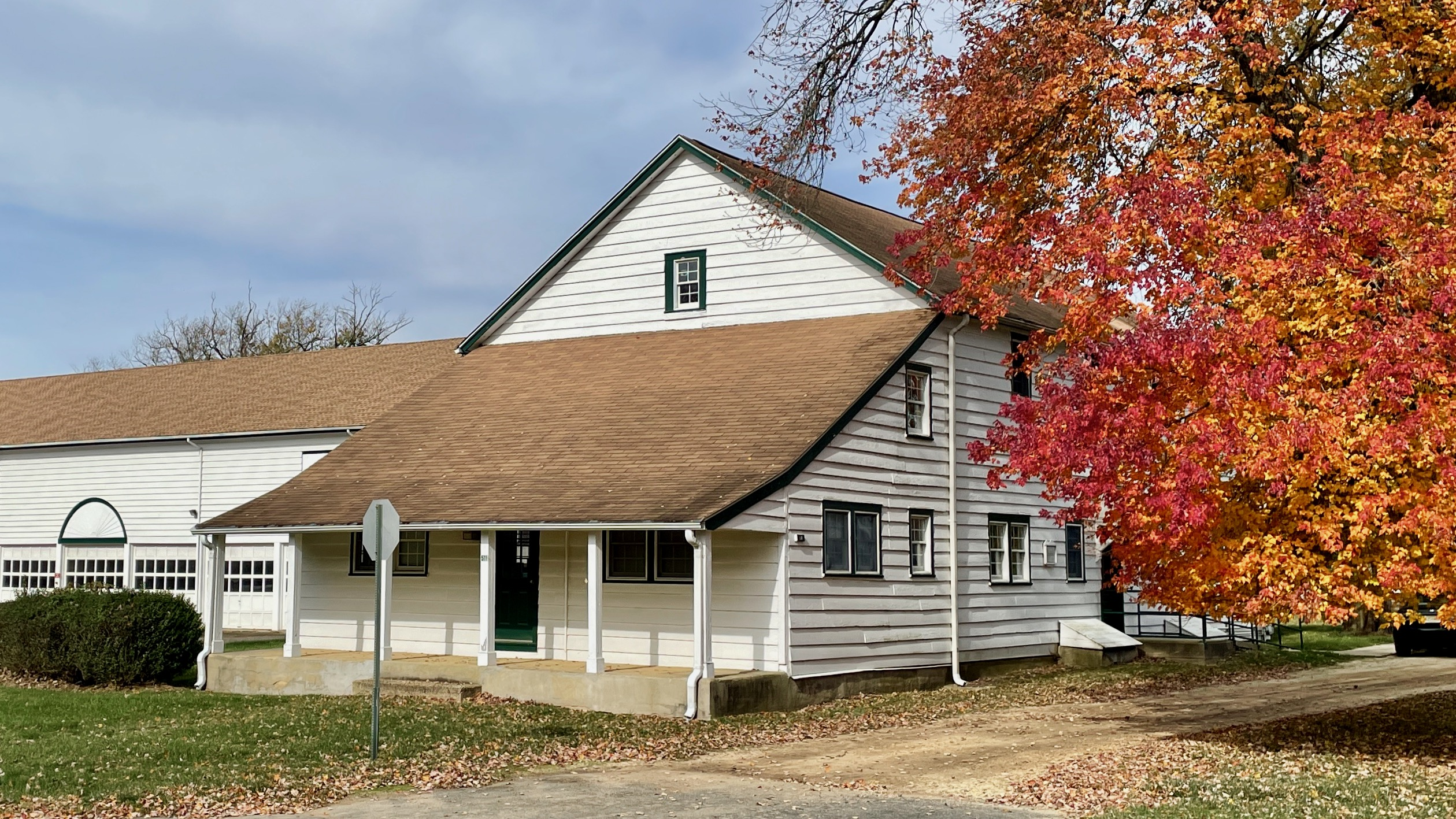
Lloyd Barn (right) and Ten Mare Barn (left)

== Notable horses ==
Championship horses bred and/or trained at Brookdale Farm include:

- Broomstick – winner of the Travers Stakes, 1904; a great sire
- Commando – winner of the Belmont Stakes, 1901
- Equipoise – the Brown Bullet of Brookdale, won ten races in 1932
- Peter Pan – winner of the Belmont Stakes, 1907
- Regret – first filly to win the Kentucky Derby, 1915
- Sysonby – won 14 of 15 starts 1904–1905
- Top Flight – won 12 of 16 starts in 1932, a record for fillies

== See also ==
- National Register of Historic Places listings in Monmouth County, New Jersey
- National Museum of Racing and Hall of Fame
- New Jersey Women's Heritage Trail
