= Geraldine Morgan Thompson =

American social reform pioneer

Geraldine Livingston Morgan Thompson (1872–1967) was an American social reform pioneer who became known as the "First Lady of New Jersey" due to her philanthropic and social service activities in New Jersey. In 1912, she founded the Monmouth County Organization for Social Service (MCOSS), which evolved through acquisitions and mergers to become Visiting Nurse Association Health Group in 2011, New Jersey's largest non-profit provider of home health, hospice, and community services.

Thompson owned Brookdale Farm, an 800-acre (320 ha) estate in Lincroft. In her will, Thompson left 206 acres (83 ha) of the estate to Monmouth County for a public park named for the Thompsons. Thompson Park includes the administrative headquarters of the Monmouth County Park System.

== Early life ==
Thompson was born in 1872 in New York City, the daughter of William Dare Morgan and Angelica Livingston Hoyt and the sister of suffragists and social reformers Ruth Morgan and Margaret Lewis Morgan Norrie, the latter of whom was the eldest of the Morgan sisters and eponym of the Margaret Lewis Norrie State Park in Dutchess County, New York. Their younger brother, journalist Gerald Morgan Sr. (1879-1948), reported on the Nazi invasion of Belgium for the New York Tribune during World War II.

In 1896, Geraldine Morgan married Lewis Steenrod Thompson, heir to a fortune amassed by his father, William Payne Thompson, a founder of the National Lead Company and later a treasurer of Standard Oil. Devoted to fishing, hunting, and horse racing, Lewis Thompson lived for much of each year at Sunny Hill, a plantation he owned in southern Georgia, while Geraldine Thompson generally remained with the children at Brookdale Farm. The couple had four children of their own, and the Brookdale household included five orphaned relatives and many servants. Lewis Thompson died in 1936.

== Activism ==
Thompson was a feminist social worker, and her activism was aimed at female prison reform, public health and juvenile justice. She donated money to psychiatric services and college scholarships. In 1923, she was the first female New Jersey delegate to a Republican National Convention. She was a lifelong friend of Eleanor Roosevelt. She helped preserve Island Beach as a state park and worked to save wildlife habitat.

Her awards included an honorary Master of Philanthropy degree, conferred in 1931 by Rutgers University. She was the first New Jersey woman to receive this honor.

== Personal life ==
Thompson maintained a 40-year romantic and professional relationship with Miriam Van Waters, a prison reformer who served as superintendent of the Massachusetts Reformatory for Women at Framingham. Van Waters was a closeted lesbian who eventually destroyed most of the letters she received from Thompson.

Thompson died on September 9, 1967, at Brookdale Farm, Lincroft, New Jersey.
