= Thompson Park (Lincroft, New Jersey) =

Park in Monmouth County, New Jersey

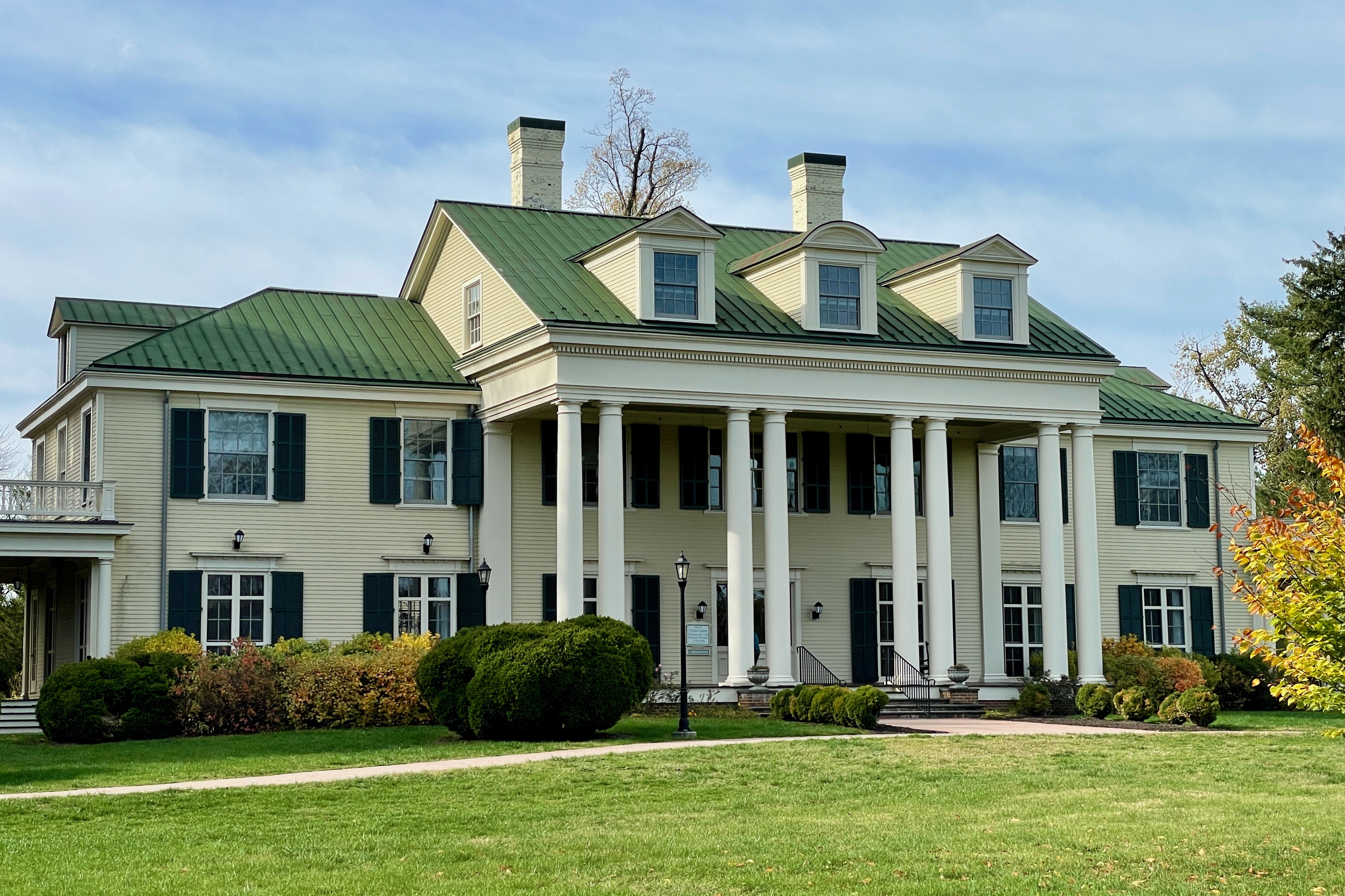
- Thompson Park Visitor Center

- Location within Monmouth County, New Jersey Location within New Jersey Location within the United States
- Location: 805 Newman Springs Road; Lincroft, NJ 07738
- Coordinates: 40°20′15″N 74°8′54″W
- Area: 677 acres (2.74 km^{2})
- Created: 1968
- Operator: Monmouth County Park System

Thompson Park is a public park located at 805 Newman Springs Road in the Lincroft section of Middletown. The 677-acre (2.74 km^{2}) park is operated by the Monmouth County Park System. In 1968, at the bequest of Geraldine Morgan Thompson, 215 acres (0.87 km^{2}) of the Brookdale Farm were donated to the county to create the park. The Brookdale Farm Historic District, located in the park, was added to the National Register of Historic Places in 2020. The visitor center is a reconstruction of the Thompson Mansion, which was destroyed by a fire in 2006. The original mansion had been remodeled and expanded by the architectural firm of Carrère and Hastings in 1896.

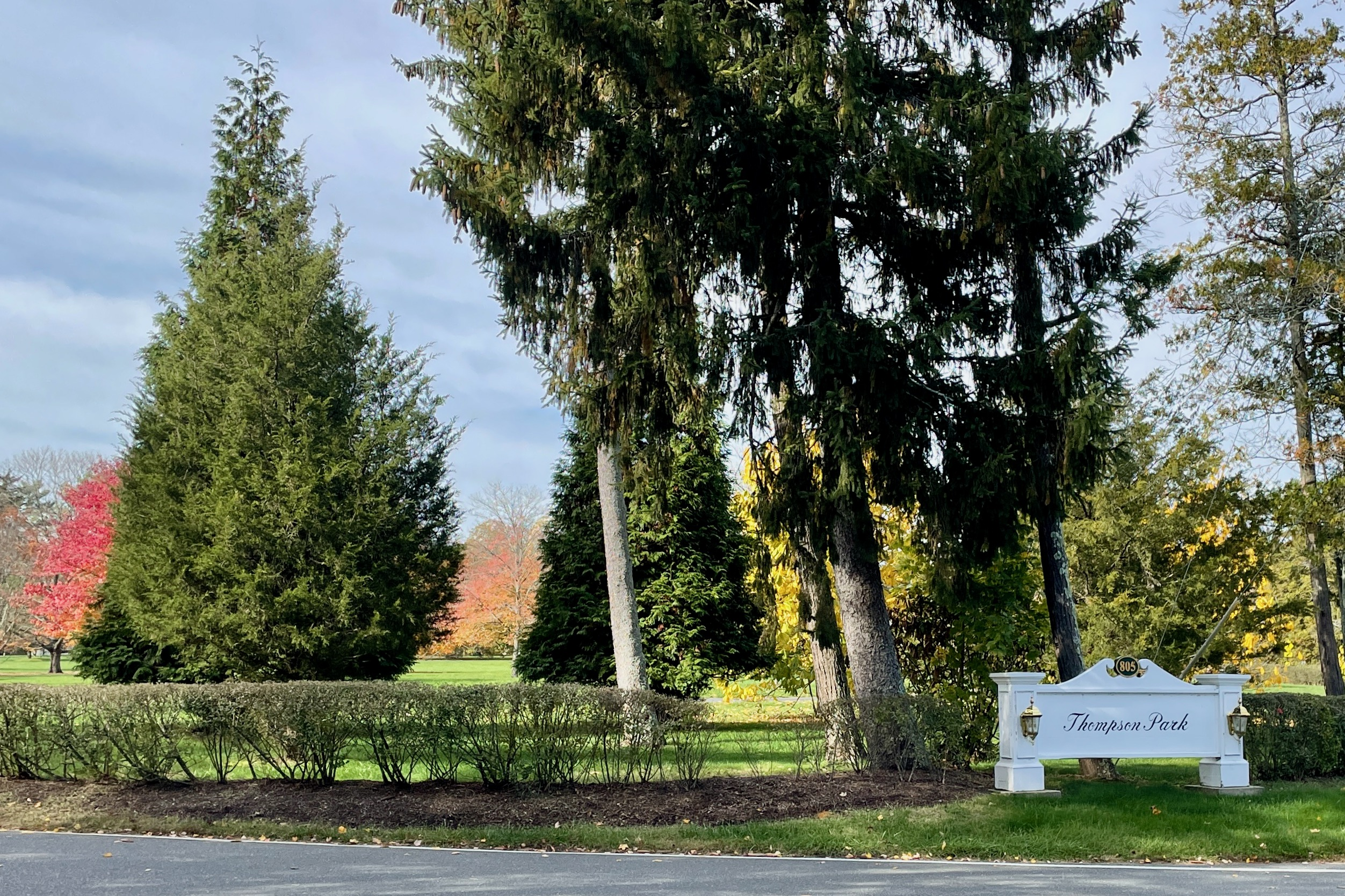
Thompson Park entrance

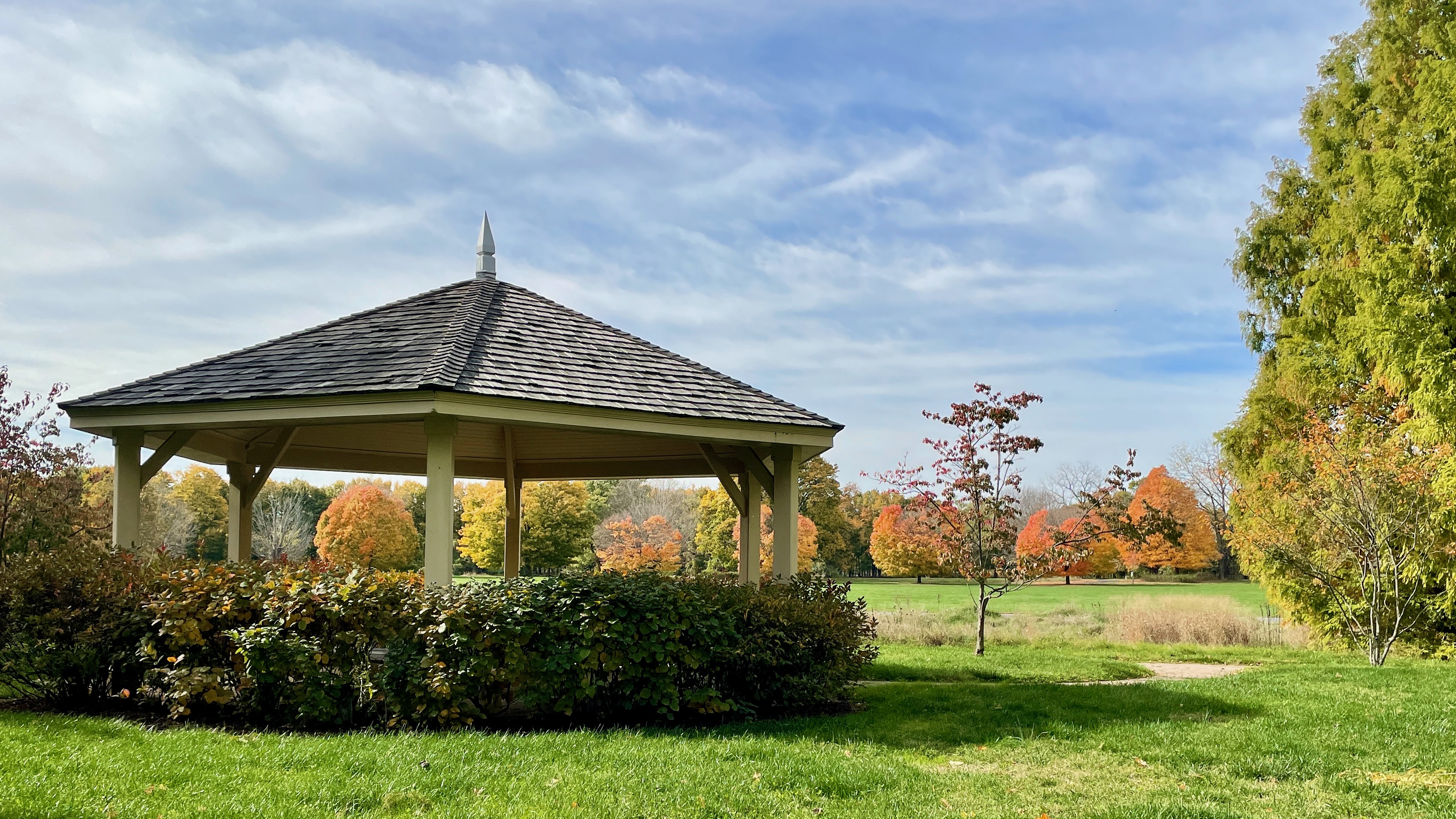
Park landscape

== See also ==
- There is another Thompson Park that is nearby, located in Monroe Township in Middlesex County
