= Esther Saunders =

American poet (1793–1862)

Esther Saunder
- Born: c. 1793
- Died: 1862
- Occupation: Poet

Esther "Hetty" Saunders (c. 1793–1862) was a poet in New Jersey, USA. She was African American and born a slave before her family escaped and she was taken in by a Quaker family in New Jersey. Her burial site at the Salem Friends Burial Ground is part of the New Jersey Women's Heritage Trail.

Saunders was born in Delaware around 1793. Her father escaped with her and her brother to freedom in Elsinboro Township, Salem County in 1800 by crossing the Delaware River. Saunders then lived in Salem County, New Jersey for much of her life. Her work includes The Little Wanderer. She was taken in, reared and educated by a Quaker family, Joseph and Ann Brick Hall.

She died on 15 December 1862 and is buried at Salem Friends Burial Ground.

== Works ==
Her works include:

- Hetty Saunders (2001). I Love to Live Alone: The Poems of Esther "Hetty" Saunders. Salem County Historical Society.
- The Hill of Age (written to honor Judy Wyring, who was a 109-year-old black woman)
