= Dinsmore Golf Course =

Golf Course in Staatsburg, New York

Coordinates: 41°51′22″N 73°55′17″W

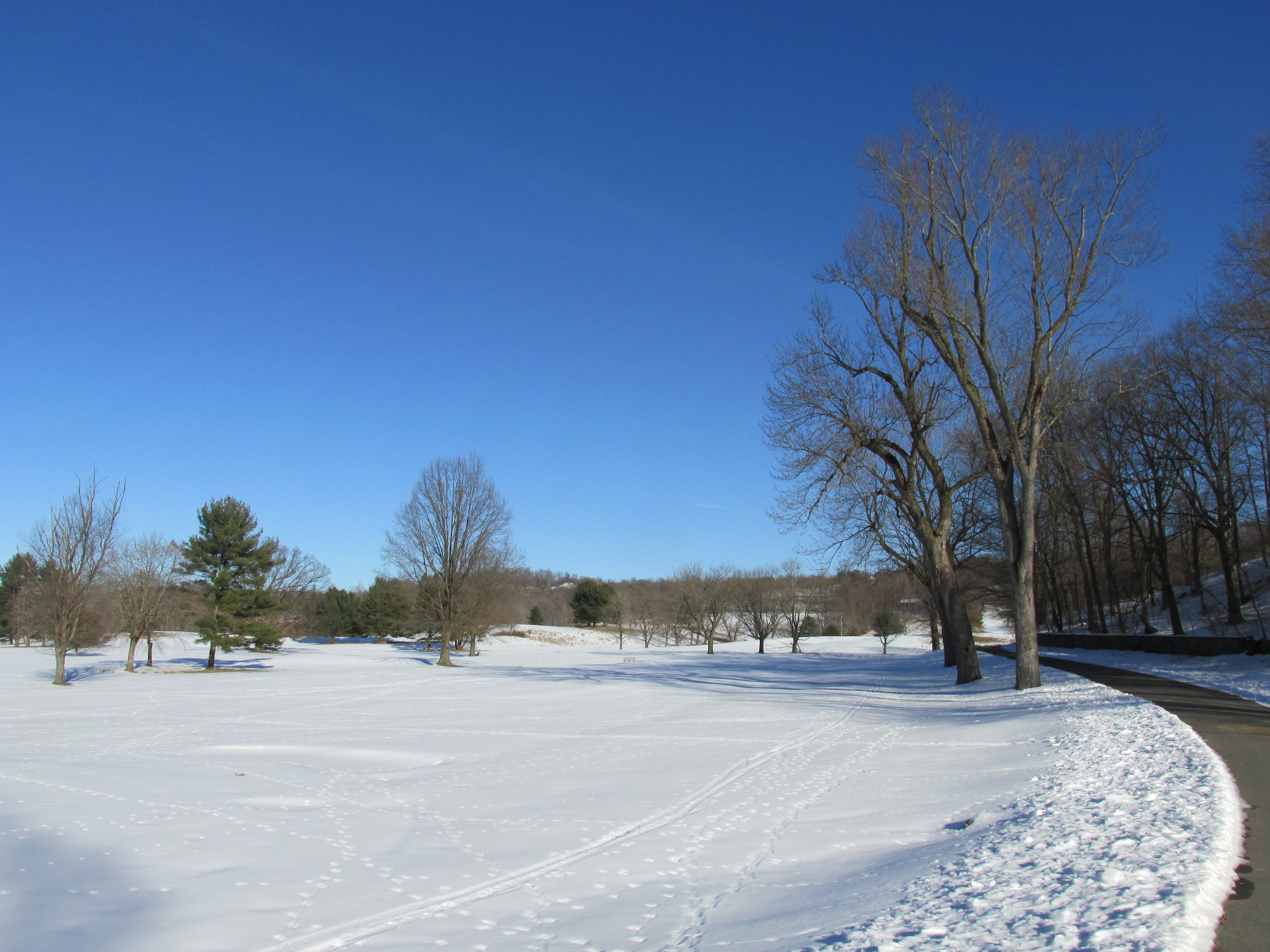
Dinsmore Golf Course in winter

Dinsmore Golf Course, located in Staatsburg, New York, is listed as the third-oldest golf course in the United States, according to the New York State Office of Parks, Recreation and Historic Preservation. It was originally created by Robert Huntington in the 1890s as a private, nine-hole course, and was expanded to a full 18 holes in 1962.

In recent decades, the course has been open to the public, and does not have any water hazards. Par is 70. The Dinsmore Golf Course provides nice views of the Hudson River and the Catskill Mountains. The course is also located inside the Ogden Mills & Ruth Livingston Mills State Park.
