= Oak Hill Academy (New Jersey) =

Private school in Monmouth County, New Jersey, United States

Location
- Lincroft, Monmouth County, New Jersey; United States
- 40.3439°N 74.1265°W

Information
- Type: Private
- Motto: Live to Dream
- Established: 1981
- NCES School ID: A9104405
- Head of school: Joseph A. Pacelli
- Faculty: 41.8 FTEs
- Enrollment: 339 (plus 12 in PreK, as of 2023–24)
- Student to teacher ratio: 8.1:1
- Campus: Suburban, 20 acres (8.1 ha)
- Colors: Red and White
- Mascot: Mustang
- Website: www.oakhillacademy.com

Oak Hill Academy is a coeducational, nonsectarian private day school located in the Lincroft section of Middletown Township, in Monmouth County, in the U.S. state of New Jersey, serving students in pre-Kindergarten through eighth grade. Oak Hill Academy was founded in September 1981 by educator Joseph A. Pacelli. The school is academically rigorous and offers advanced courses in mathematics and Latin. Oak Hill has swimming as a mandatory part of the physical education program.

As of the 2023–24 school year, the school had an enrollment of 339 students (plus 12 in PreK) and 41.8 classroom teachers (on an FTE basis), for a student–teacher ratio of 8.1:1. The school's student body was 60.5% (205) White, 20.4% (69) Asian, 12.7% (43) two or more races, 4.1% (14) Black and 2.4% (69) Hispanic.

Oak Hill Academy is a member of the Educational Records Bureau and the New Jersey Association of Independent Schools. The school was accredited by the Middle States Association of Colleges and Schools in 1986, 1996, and 2008.

== Academic program ==
=== Upper school ===
Grades five to eight, separated and departmentalized classes are taught by teachers who are experts in their subject areas. Daily sessions in literature, language arts, math, science, and social studies stress critical thinking, communication skills, writing ability, and good organizational habits. These courses, as well as French, Latin, Spanish, critical reading, music, drama, computer science, art, and physical education provide a preparation for high school years. "Explorations," a research-based program and a project-oriented math workshop, allows students to work hands-on in cooperative groups using technology.

=== Languages ===
Oak Hill Academy provides a comprehensive language program for students from Pre-K through 8th grade. From Pre-K to 4th grade, all students study French. In the upper school (grades 5-7), students alternate between French and Spanish on a semester basis. By 8th grade, students have the option to choose between French or Spanish to study for the entire year. The program prepares students who choose French or Spanish in 8th grade for French 2, Spanish 2, and in some cases, French or Spanish 3 classes in high school, depending on the curriculum. The school also offers a two-year Latin program for 7th and 8th graders.

=== Lower school ===
Beginning with a full-day kindergarten program, the curriculum is designed with the stages of child development in mind. Traditional areas of reading, writing, mathematics, science, and social studies are taught in a hands-on manner. These basic areas are complemented by Orff music, drama, computer science, art, library, physical education, French. An enrichment program offers changing themes in a special "HandsOn/HeadsOn" room where real-life activities are based on grade level curriculum.

=== Pre-kindergarten ===
Learning and self-confidence are encouraged through discovery and play with an emphasis on all aspects of childhood development. Interest areas allow for multisensory involvement of the student in inter-disciplinary subjects. The reading and math programs prepare students for the lower school curriculum.

== Policy ==
=== Dress code ===
Oak Hill has a uniform dress code. Girls must wear the navy blue school sweater, skirts (in blue tan or gray), blouses (blue, yellow, pink, white, tan), and shoes. No sneakers are permitted (except during gym). During the winter, girls may wear pants in the same three colors. Boys must wear the school sweater, pants (in blue, tan or gray), shirts (blue, tan, pink, yellow, white), shoes, and a tie and belt.
