= Bridget Smith House =

- U.S. National Register of Historic Places
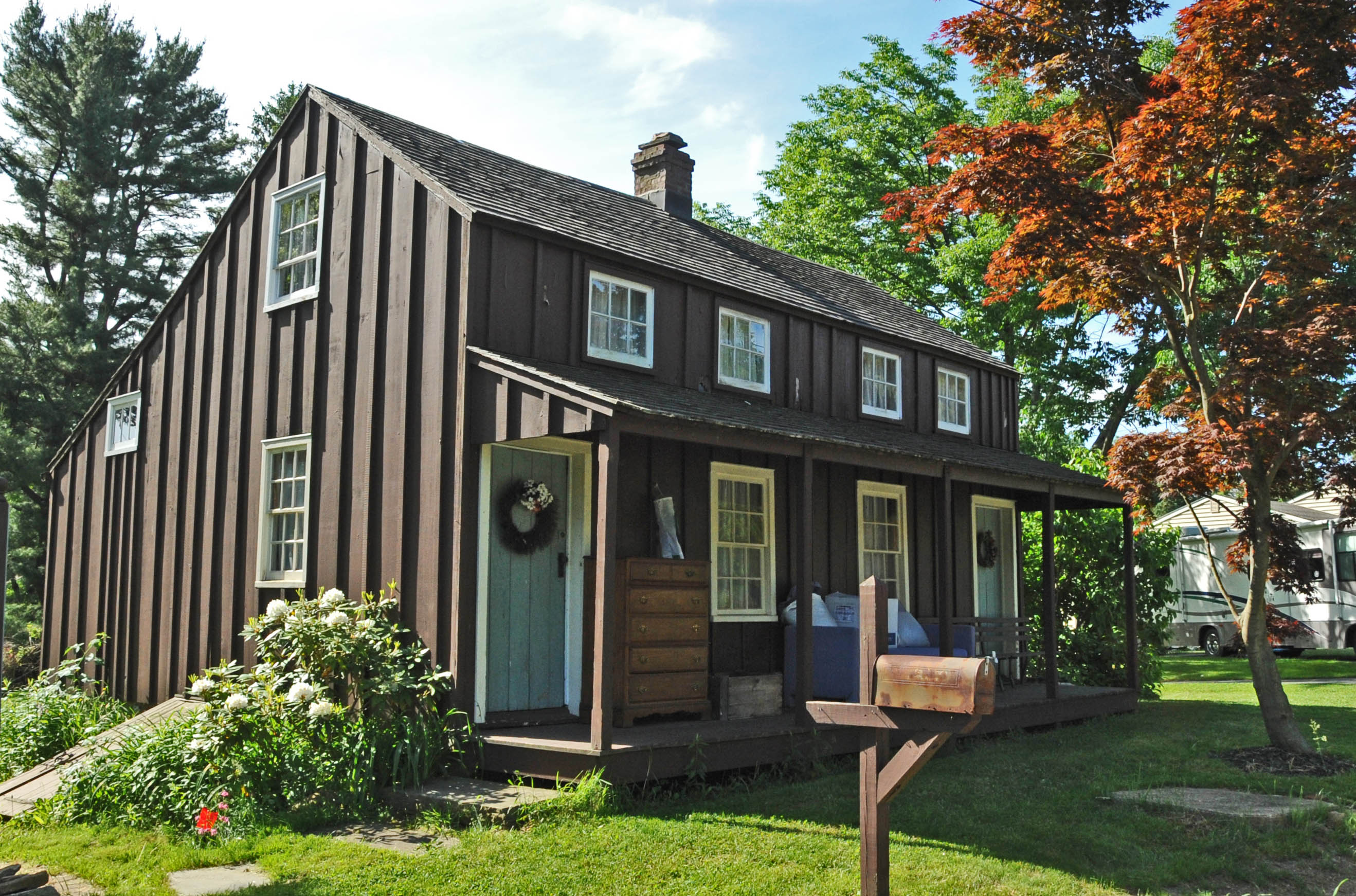

- Location within Morris County, New Jersey Location within New Jersey Location within the United States
- Location: 124 Randolph Avenue, Mine Hill Township, New Jersey
- Coordinates: 40.8738°N 74.5965°W
- Area: 0.4 acres (0.16 ha)
- Architectural style: Mid 19th Century Revival
- NRHP reference No.: 98000099
- Added to NRHP: February 27, 1998

The Bridget Smith House is a historic home that housed Irish immigrant families. It is located at 124 Randolph Avenue in Mine Hill Township, New Jersey and is part of the New Jersey Women's Heritage Trail. It was added to the National Register of Historic Places on February 27, 1998.

== See also ==
- National Register of Historic Places listings in Morris County, New Jersey
