= Vincent Favale =

American entertainment industry professional and co-founder of Comedy Central

Vincent Favale (born September 4, 1959) is an American entertainment industry professional and co-founder of Comedy Central.

== Early life and education ==
A native of Bath Beach, Brooklyn, Favale attended Saint Finbar School and William Grady High School before graduating from Brooklyn College. While he was a teenager, two of Favale's brothers died within three years of each other, an experience that later served as inspiration for his musical Hereafter.

== Broadcasting career ==
In 1982, while working in the commercial traffic department at WYNY, Favale auditioned for and appeared on Late Night with David Letterman. He went on to co-found and serve as vice president of programming at Comedy Central, where he developed the television series State of the Union Undressed, created and hosted The 800 Club, and served as producer of the Real Deal. Favale was a producer for David Letterman during his run on CBS late night shows, supervising Late Show with David Letterman from 1996 through its finale in 2015. Between 1998 and 2001 he also oversaw the Howard Stern Radio Show, part of CBS's late night programming. He often appeared as himself on both shows. In 2003, a David Letterman comedy piece that featured Favale was given a "Cheer" by TV Guide. In 2004, Howard Stern featured a song that Favale had written ("Restless, Restless") on his morning radio show as part of the "Restless Restless Song Contest." One of the most popular submissions of Favale's song was by Robert Goulet. A "Best Of" compilation CD was eventually released on Bandcamp.

One of Favale's most well known segments on The Howard Stern Show is when he brought in video love letters he made in 1984 (aka the "Debbie Tapes") when he was wooing his soon to be wife Debbie.

In 2015 Favale was executive producer of "David Letterman: A Life in Television," a prime-time tribute. Favale was the only member of Letterman's team to stay on when Stephen Colbert took over, and after he helped oversee the refurbishing of the Ed Sullivan Theater prior to its launch he served as the overseeing supervisor for The Late Show With Stephen Colbert.

He eventually became the vice-president of East Coast late-night programming at CBS. In April 2017 he was named SVP Talent Development at CBS Television Studios with responsibilities including "identify[ing] comedic talent and develop[ing] programming for the studio."

In June 2018 Favale added creative oversight of the new division CBS Experiences. He was the executive producer of the inaugural event, "An Evening with Sunday Morning."

Later that year he was accused of using derogatory language towards those of alternate sexual orientations in the workplace, and was placed on leave, and used those same words regardless of orientation. Favale denied the allegations with the following statement: "Allegations that I have ever retaliated against anyone in any fashion are 100% false. I have spent my entire career working at comedy shows, where there has always been a wide latitude to make transgressive jokes while preparing the program. While we make a lot of jokes, these jokes attributed to me, whether said in rehearsals or production meetings, are being taken out of context and were not said in the way being presented here."

Favale finished out his contract with CBS and announced in September 2019 that he was launching his own production company, Favale Media. CBS President of Entertainment Kelly Kahl stated in a joint press release: "We thank Vinnie for his many years and accomplishments at CBS and wish him and his new company all the best."

== Other work ==
Favale wrote (with Frankie Keane) and produced Hereafter, an off-Broadway musical about dealing with the loss of a loved one. Favale was inspired to write the musical after the 2003 death of a New Jersey teenager, which brought back memories of dealing with the deaths of two of his brothers as a teenager. After raising $60,000 through a Kickstarter campaign, Hereafter opened at the Theater 80 in 2012 to positive reviews. A second production was mounted at the Snapple Theater Center in 2014 [11] and was featured on WPIX. An Argentine production of Hereafter opened at Buenos Aires’ Metropolitan Sura in 2017. Actor and singer Danny Aiello recorded the Hereafter song "Talk To Me," and Favale worked with Aiello on a film version of the musical before Aiello's death in 2019.

Favale served as a board member for Project Rebirth, the nonprofit organization that released Rebirth, a documentary film about the September 11 attacks that premiered at the Sundance Film Festival in 2011 and received a Peabody Award.

Favale also wrote Web-Sightings: A Collection of Web Sites We’d Like to See, "one of the first consumer-focused books about the internet," published in 1996 by Pocket Books.

Favale has volunteered his services with two New Jersey–based grief centers: Good Grief and Common Ground. He produced fundraising videos in 2015, 2016 and 2017 for Common Ground in Manalapan, New Jersey, and was honored by Good Grief in Morristown, New Jersey, with the Hope Award in October 2012.

Favale was honored by Fight For Sight at their 2016 "Lights -On" Gala.

Favale served on the board of the New Jersey, Asbury Park Music In Film Festival in 2017 and 2018.

Favale served on the board of the Count Basie Theater in Red Bank, New Jersey, in 2010.

Favale was honored by Brooklyn College as Alumnus Of The Year in 2014.

== Personal life ==
Favale lives in the Lincroft section of Middletown Township, New Jersey, with his wife Debbie Slotin and their son Jonathan.
