= Margaret Lewis Norrie State Park =

State park in New York, United States

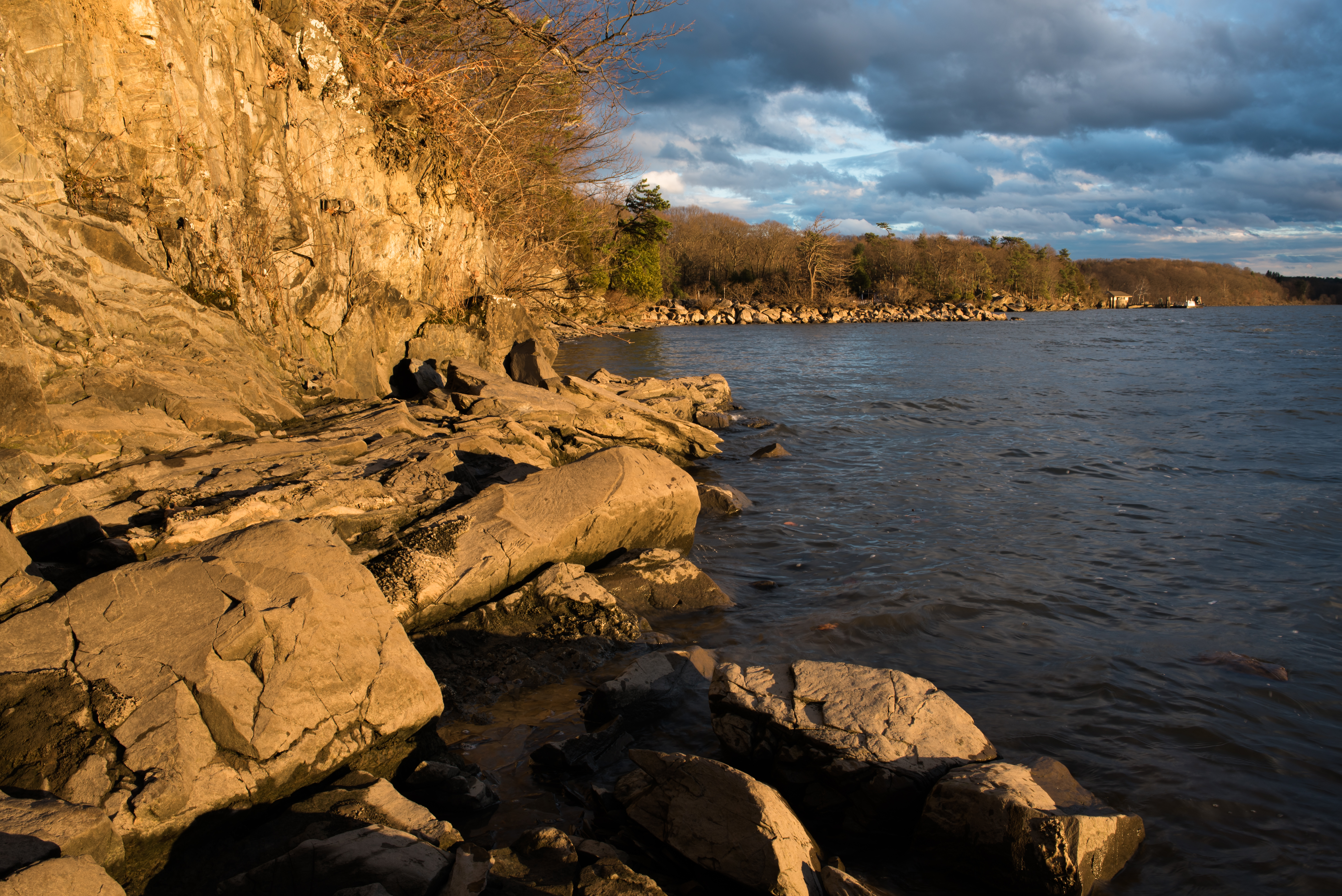
- The Hudson River at Margaret Lewis Norrie State Park

- Location within New York
- Type: State park
- Location: 9 Old Post Road; Staatsburg, New York
- Coordinates: 41°51′25″N 73°55′19″W
- Area: 356 acres (1.44 km^{2})
- Created: 1934
- Operator: New York State Office of Parks, Recreation and Historic Preservation
- Visitors: 203,730 (in 2014) (Note: Combined attendance for Margaret Lewis Norrie State Park and Ogden Mills & Ruth Livingston Mills State Park.)
- Open: All year
- Website: Margaret Lewis Norrie State Park

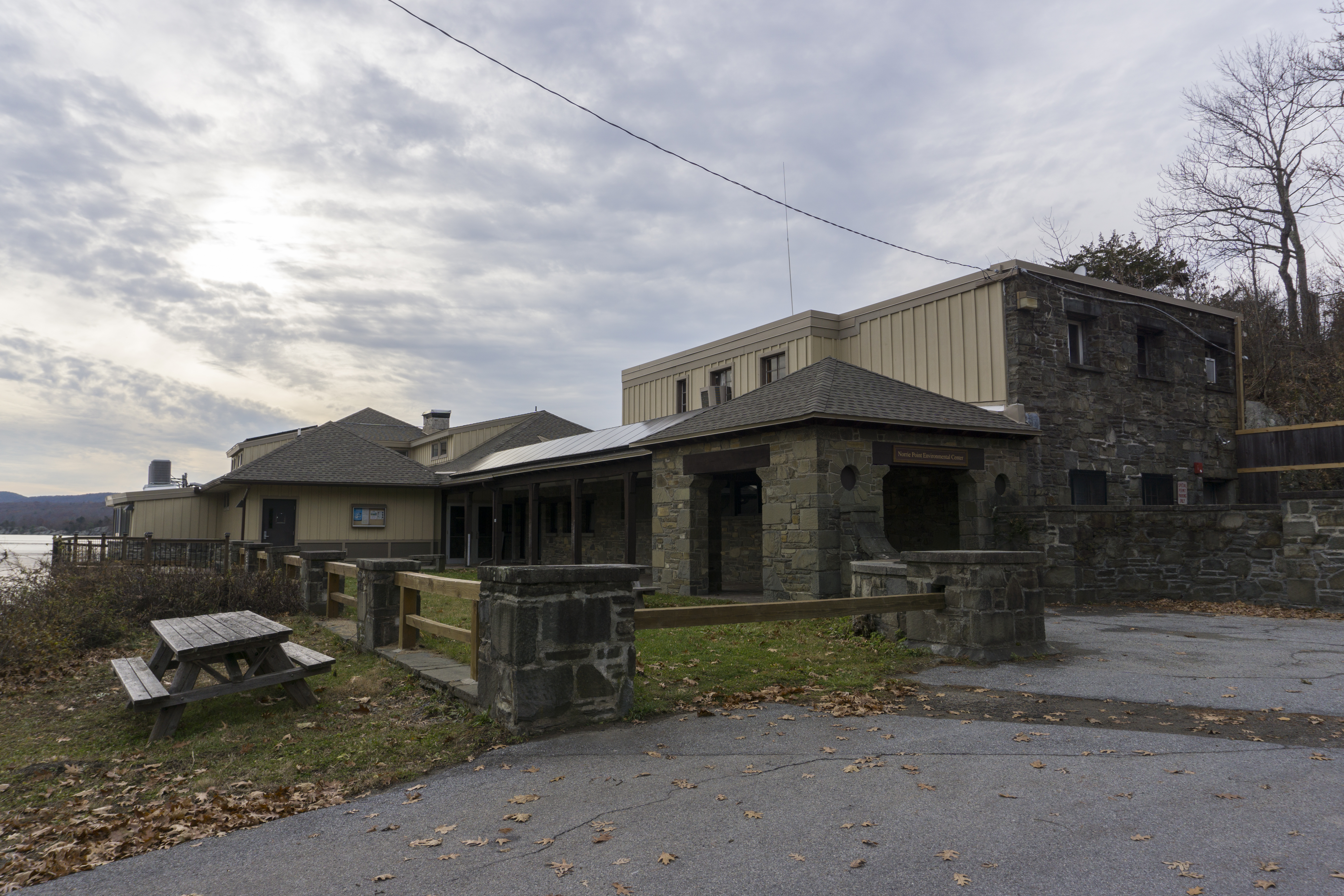
The NYSDEC Norrie Point Environmental Center is located within the park

Margaret Lewis Norrie State Park is a 356-acre (1.44 km^{2}) state park in Dutchess County, New York in the United States. The park is located on the east shore of the Hudson River in the Town of Hyde Park and also includes Esopus Island.

Margaret Lewis Norrie State Park is adjacent to Ogden Mills & Ruth Livingston Mills State Park, and the two parks are collectively known as Mills-Norrie State Park.

== History ==
The park's lands were donated to New York State by Geraldine Morgan Thompson in memory of her sister, Margaret Lewis Norrie. A large Civilian Conservation Corps camp existed at the park in 1937, housing workers that were developing the park's facilities.

== Nearby state parks and historic sites ==
- Ogden Mills & Ruth Livingston Mills State Park (Dutchess County)
- James Baird State Park (Dutchess County)
- Staatsburgh State Historic Site (Dutchess County)
- Lake Taghkanic State Park (Columbia County)
- Clermont State Historic Site (Columbia County)
- Olana State Historic Site (Columbia County)

== See also ==
- List of New York state parks
