= Lincroft, New Jersey =

Populated place in Monmouth County, New Jersey, US

- Census-designated place
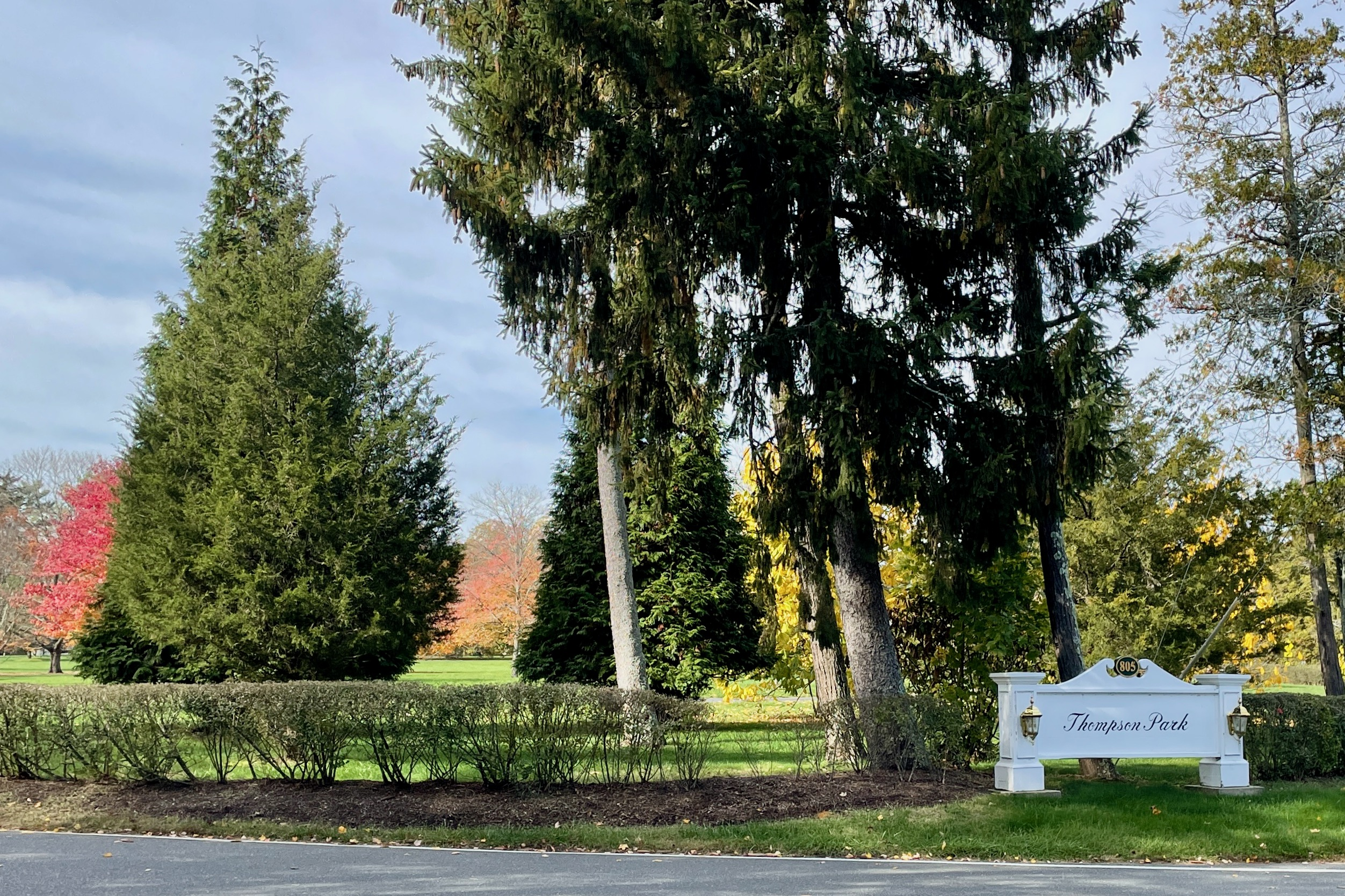
- Entrance to Thompson Park in Lincroft

- Location of Lincroft in Monmouth County highlighted in red (left). Inset map: Location of Monmouth County in New Jersey highlighted in orange (right).

- Location in Monmouth County Location in New Jersey Location in the United States
- Coordinates: 40.335293°N 74.132838°W
- Country: United States
- State: New Jersey
- County: Monmouth
- Township: Middletown

Area
  - Total: 5.80 sq mi (15.01 km^{2})
  - Land: 5.58 sq mi (14.46 km^{2})
  - Water: 0.21 sq mi (0.55 km^{2}) 3.78%
- Elevation: 46 ft (14 m)

Population (2020)
  - Total: 7,060
  - Density: 1,264.7/sq mi (488.32/km^{2})
- Time zone: UTC−05:00 (Eastern (EST))
  - Summer (DST): UTC−04:00 (Eastern (EDT))
- ZIP Code: 07738
- Area codes: 732/848
- FIPS code: 34-40320
- GNIS feature ID: 2390072

Lincroft is an unincorporated community and census-designated place (CDP) in Middletown Township, Monmouth County, New Jersey, United States. As of the 2020 United States census, the CDP had a population of 7,060, reflecting a 15.1% increase from the 6,135 residents enumerated at the 2010 U.S. census, in turn a decline of 120 residents (-1.9%) from the 6,255 counted in the 2000 U.S. census.

== Geography ==
Lincroft is in north-central Monmouth County, in the southwest corner of Middletown Township. It is bordered to the west by Holmdel Township. It is bordered to the south by the Swimming River Reservoir, across which is Colts Neck Township, while to the southeast it is bordered by the lake's outlet, the Swimming River, with the borough of Tinton Falls on the opposite side. The Garden State Parkway forms the northeast border of Lincroft, with access from Exit 114 (CR 52) and Exit 109 (CR 520).

According to the U.S. Census Bureau, Lincroft has a total area of 5.80 square miles (15.02 km^{2}), including 5.58 square miles (14.45 km^{2}) of land and 0.21 square miles (0.54 km^{2}) of water (3.68%).

== Demographics ==
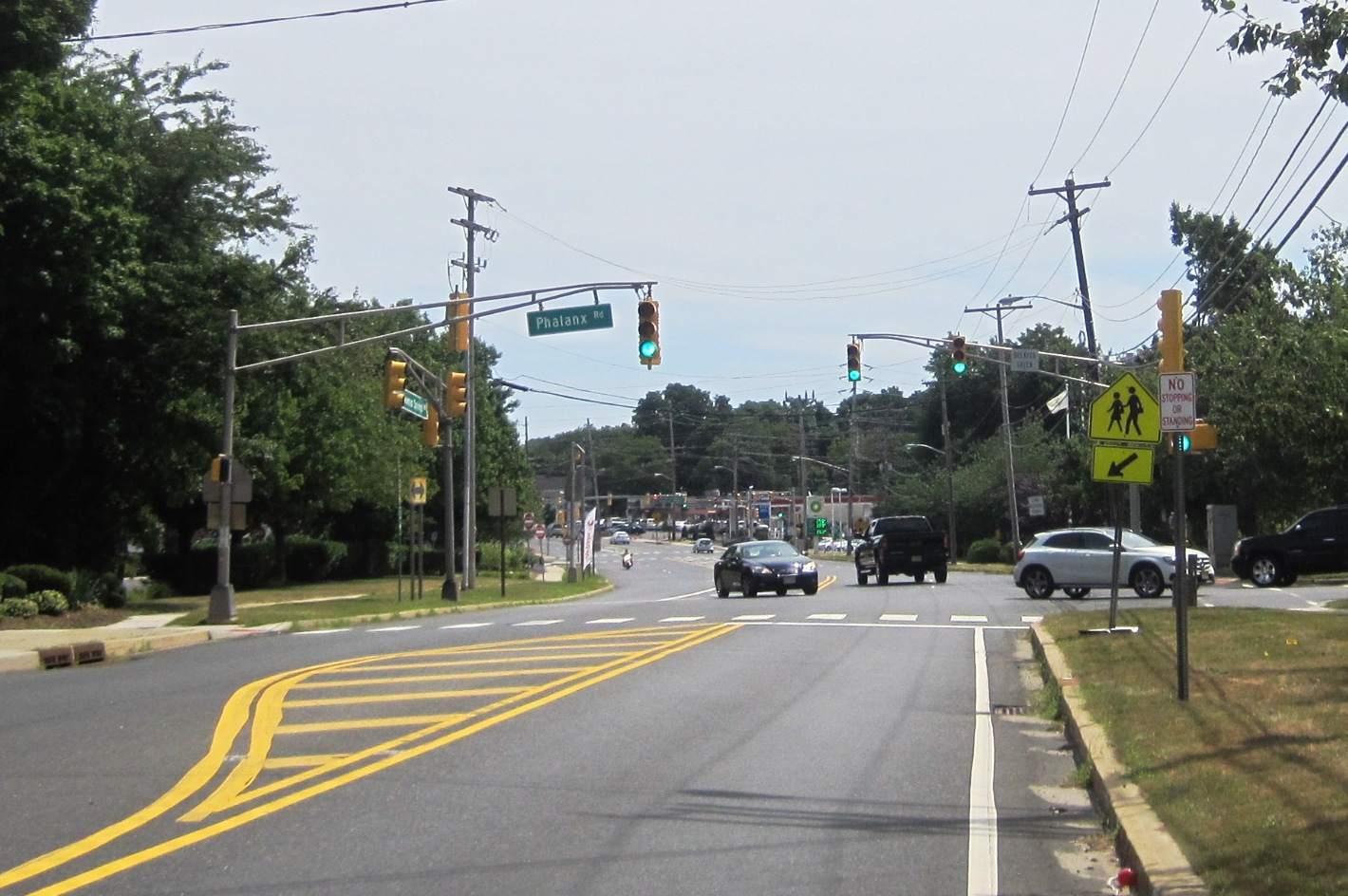
Near the center of the Lincroft business district at the intersection of Newman Springs Road and Phalanx Road

Historical population
Census	Pop.	Note	%±
1990	6,193		—
2000	6,255		1.0%
2010	6,135		−1.9%
2020	7,060		15.1%
Population sources: 1950 1960 1970; 1980 1990 2000; 2010 2020

Lincroft first appeared as a census designated place in the 1990 U.S. census.

=== Racial and ethnic composition ===
Lincroft CDP, New Jersey – Racial and ethnic composition Note: the US Census treats Hispanic/Latino as an ethnic category. This table excludes Latinos from the racial categories and assigns them to a separate category. Hispanics/Latinos may be of any race.
Race / Ethnicity (NH = Non-Hispanic)	Pop 2000	Pop 2010	Pop 2020	% 2000	% 2010	% 2020
White alone (NH)	5,711	5,621	6,139	91.30%	91.62%	86.95%
Black or African American alone (NH)	51	31	43	0.82%	0.51%	0.61%
Native American or Alaska Native alone (NH)	5	0	8	0.08%	0.00%	0.11%
Asian alone (NH)	279	199	302	4.46%	3.24%	4.28%
Native Hawaiian or Pacific Islander alone (NH)	0	0	1	0.00%	0.00%	0.01%
Other race alone (NH)	8	4	15	0.13%	0.07%	0.21%
Mixed race or Multiracial (NH)	42	62	158	0.67%	1.01%	2.24%
Hispanic or Latino (any race)	159	218	394	2.54%	3.55%	5.58%
Total	6,255	6,135	7,060	100.00%	100.00%	100.00%

=== 2020 census ===
As of the 2020 census, Lincroft had a population of 7,060. The median age was 43.8 years. 24.7% of residents were under the age of 18 and 19.1% of residents were 65 years of age or older. For every 100 females there were 95.4 males, and for every 100 females age 18 and older there were 91.8 males age 18 and over.

99.9% of residents lived in urban areas, while 0.1% lived in rural areas.

There were 2,427 households in Lincroft, of which 37.8% had children under the age of 18 living in them. Of all households, 69.9% were married-couple households, 9.2% were households with a male householder and no spouse or partner present, and 18.2% were households with a female householder and no spouse or partner present. About 19.1% of all households were made up of individuals and 14.8% had someone living alone who was 65 years of age or older.

There were 2,509 housing units, of which 3.3% were vacant. The homeowner vacancy rate was 0.8% and the rental vacancy rate was 2.6%.

=== 2010 census ===
The 2010 United States census counted 6,135 people, 2,102 households, and 1,675 families in the CDP. The population density was 1,099.5 per square mile (424.5/km^{2}). There were 2,159 housing units at an average density of 386.9 per square mile (149.4/km^{2}). The racial makeup was 94.77% (5,814) White, 0.52% (32) Black or African American, 0.00% (0) Native American, 3.26% (200) Asian, 0.00% (0) Pacific Islander, 0.23% (14) from other races, and 1.22% (75) from two or more races. Hispanic or Latino of any race were 3.55% (218) of the population.

Of the 2,102 households, 39.3% had children under the age of 18; 71.4% were married couples living together; 6.3% had a female householder with no husband present and 20.3% were non-families. Of all households, 18.2% were made up of individuals and 13.8% had someone living alone who was 65 years of age or older. The average household size was 2.89 and the average family size was 3.29.

26.7% of the population were under the age of 18, 5.5% from 18 to 24, 19.1% from 25 to 44, 31.8% from 45 to 64, and 16.9% who were 65 years of age or older. The median age was 44.2 years. For every 100 females, the population had 93.4 males. For every 100 females ages 18 and older there were 92.3 males.

=== 2000 census ===
As of the 2000 United States census there were 6,255 people, 2,121 households, and 1,718 families living in the CDP. The population density was 1,113.0 inhabitants per square mile (429.7/km^{2}). There were 2,160 housing units at an average density of 384.3 per square mile (148.4/km^{2}). The racial makeup of the CDP was 93.11% White, 0.83% African American, 0.08% Native American, 4.52% Asian, 0.66% from other races, and 0.80% from two or more races. Hispanic or Latino of any race were 2.54% of the population.

There were 2,121 households, out of which 41.6% had children under the age of 18 living with them, 73.8% were married couples living together, 5.3% had a female householder with no husband present, and 19.0% were non-families. 17.3% of all households were made up of individuals, and 12.8% had someone living alone who was 65 years of age or older. The average household size was 2.91 and the average family size was 3.31.

In the CDP the population was spread out, with 28.1% under the age of 18, 5.2% from 18 to 24, 25.4% from 25 to 44, 27.6% from 45 to 64, and 13.7% who were 65 years of age or older. The median age was 40 years. For every 100 females, there were 97.3 males. For every 100 females age 18 and over, there were 94.0 males.

The median income for a household in the CDP was $94,199, and the median income for a family was $104,972. Males had a median income of $79,177 versus $41,875 for females. The per capita income for the CDP was $37,910. About 3.0% of families and 5.6% of the population were below the poverty line, including 4.5% of those under age 18 and 14.0% of those age 65 or over.

== Education ==
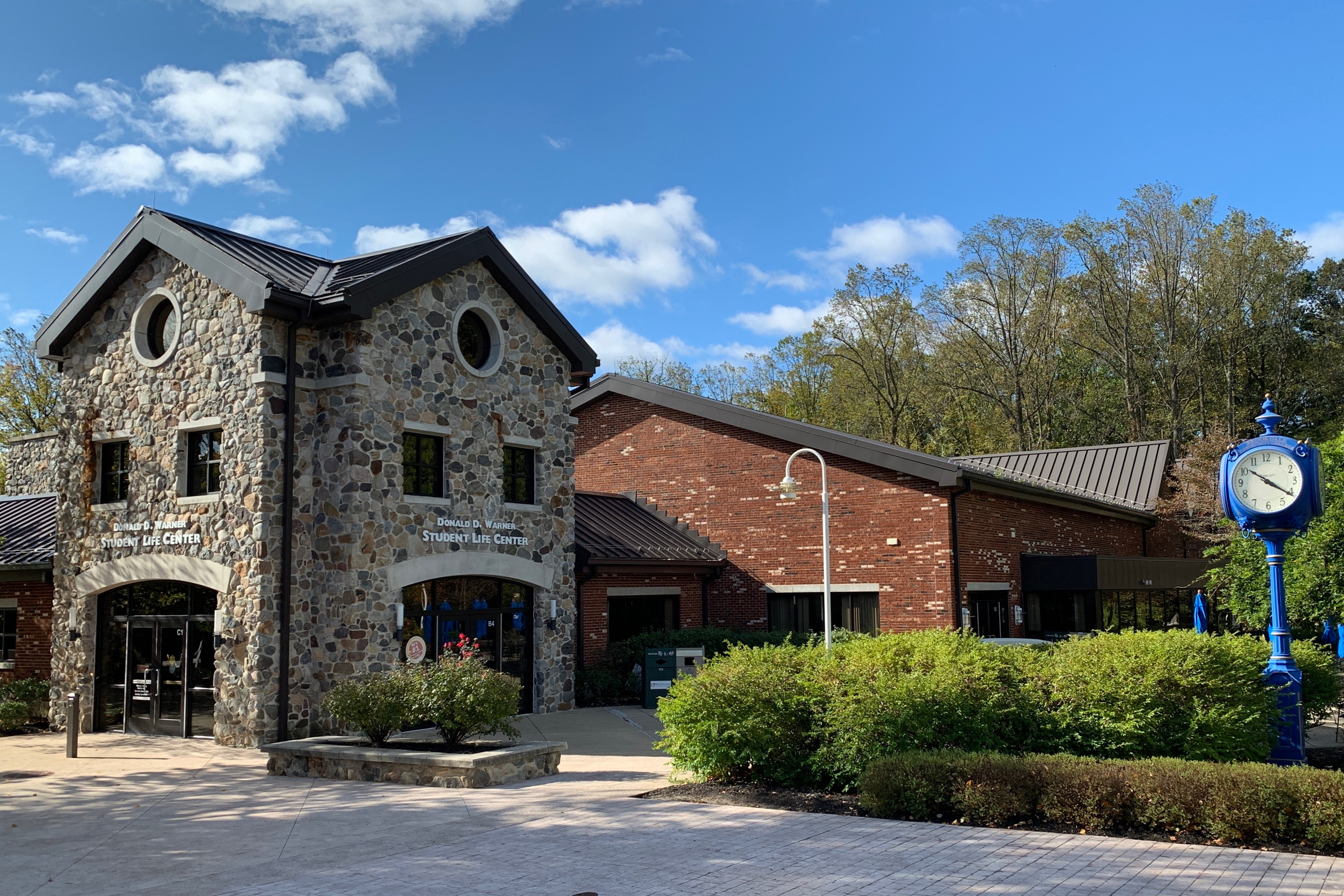
The Donald D. Warner Student Life Center at Brookdale Community College's main campus in Lincroft

Lincroft is home to several schools, including:

- Brookdale Community College, the community college of Monmouth County
- Christian Brothers Academy is an all-boys College preparatory school with a focus on Christian education run by the Institute of the Brothers of the Christian Schools
- High Technology High School, a vocational school situated on the Brookdale Campus
- Lincroft Elementary School, a public K-5 elementary school operating under the Middletown Township Public School District
- Oak Hill Academy, a private, nonsectarian elementary school for grades K-8 founded in 1981.
- St. Leo the Great School, a private Catholic elementary school (K-8) operated by the Roman Catholic Diocese of Trenton that was recognized in 2012 by the National Blue Ribbon Schools Program.

== Historic district ==
- Brookdale Farm Historic District
- U.S. National Register of Historic Places
- U.S. Historic district
- New Jersey Register of Historic Places
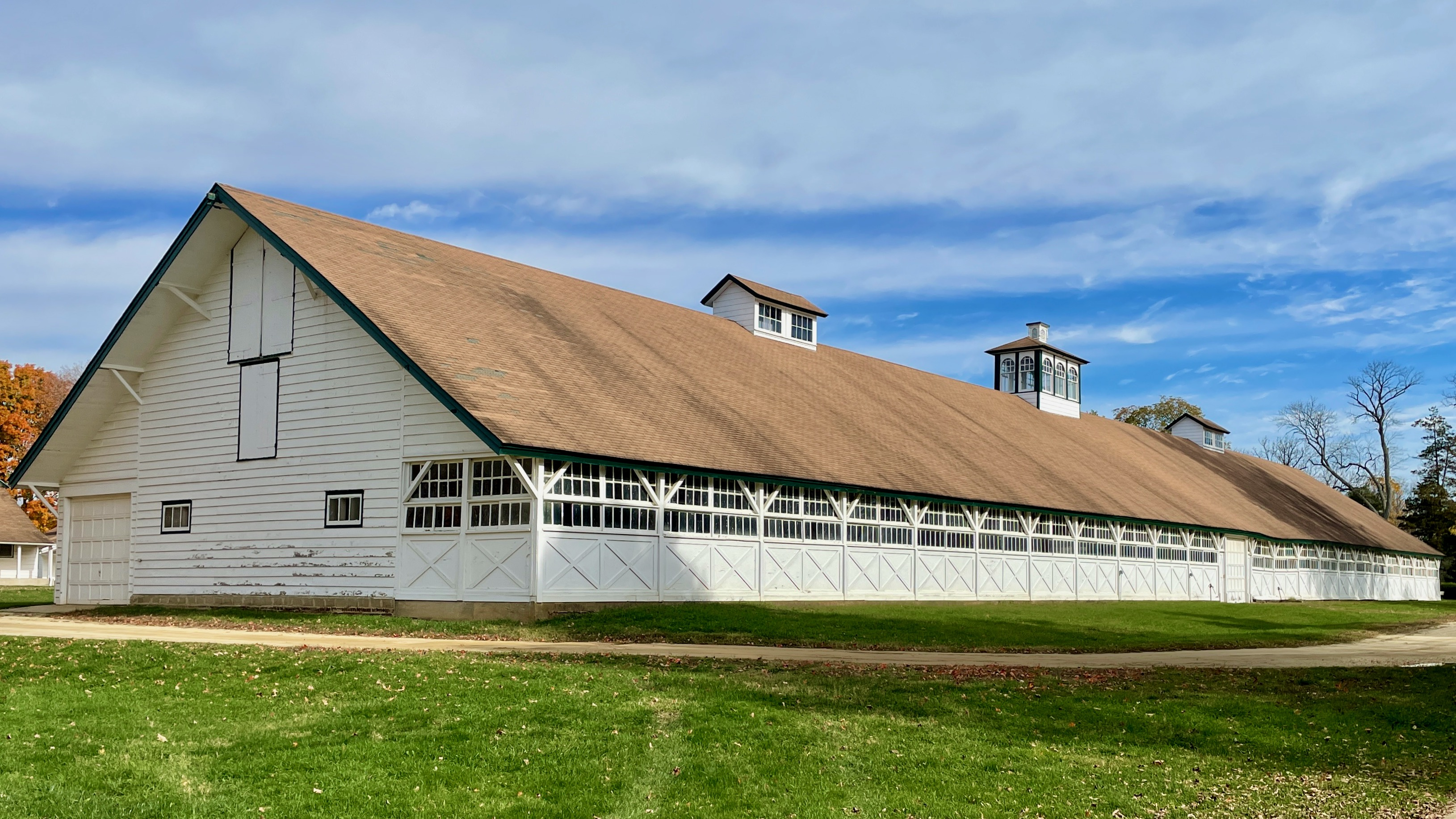
- Training Stable at Brookdale Farm
- Location: 805 Newman Springs Road
- Area: 228 acres (92 ha)
- NRHP reference No.: 100004105
- NJRHP No.: 3360

Significant dates
- Added to NRHP: November 9, 2020
- Designated NJRHP: May 9, 2019

Brookdale Farm is a 228-acre (0.92 km^{2}) historic district encompassing the core part of the farm. It was added to the National Register of Historic Places on November 9, 2020, for its significance in agriculture, architecture and entertainment/recreation from 1786 to 1932. The district has 19 contributing buildings and one contributing site.

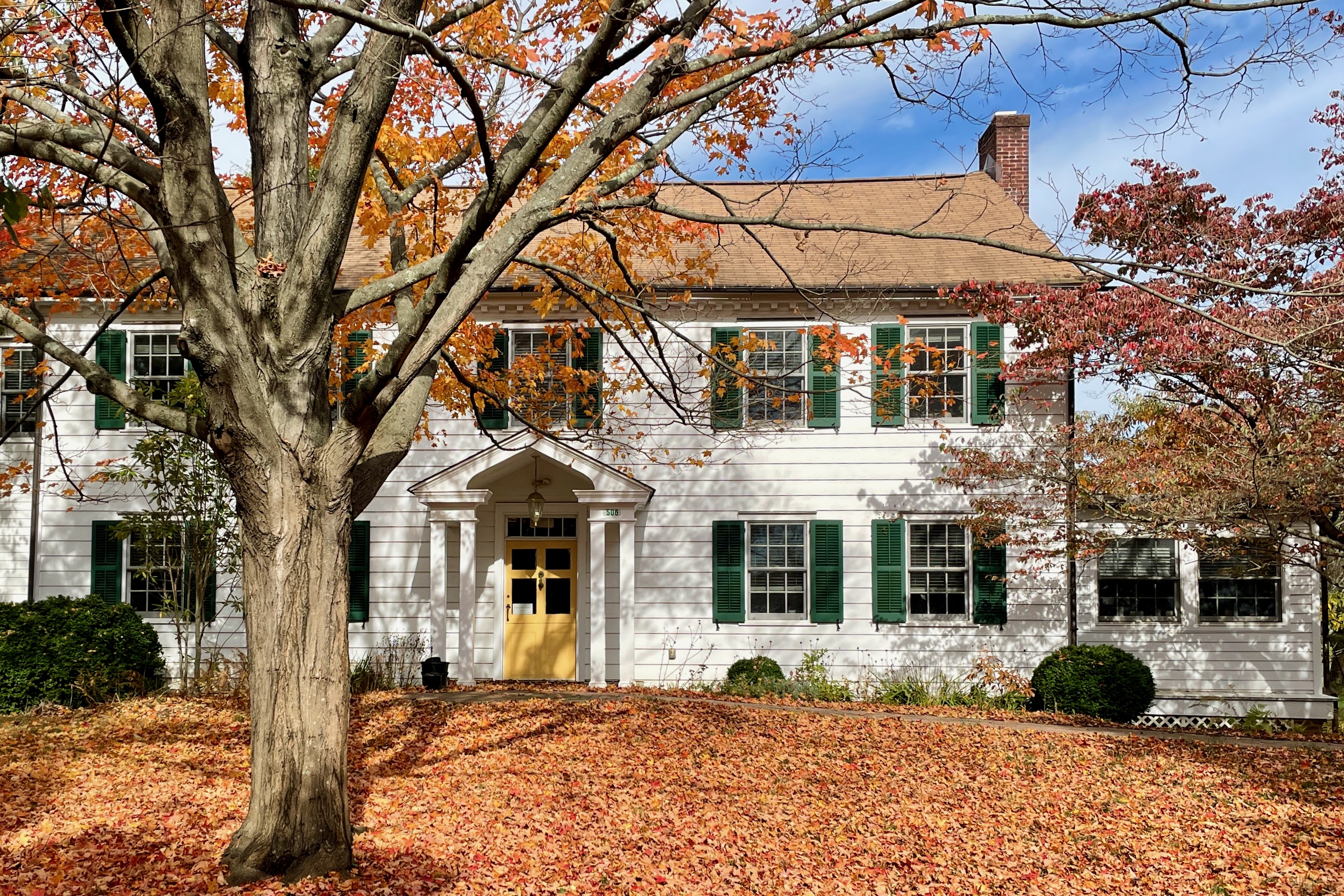
Thomas Lloyd House

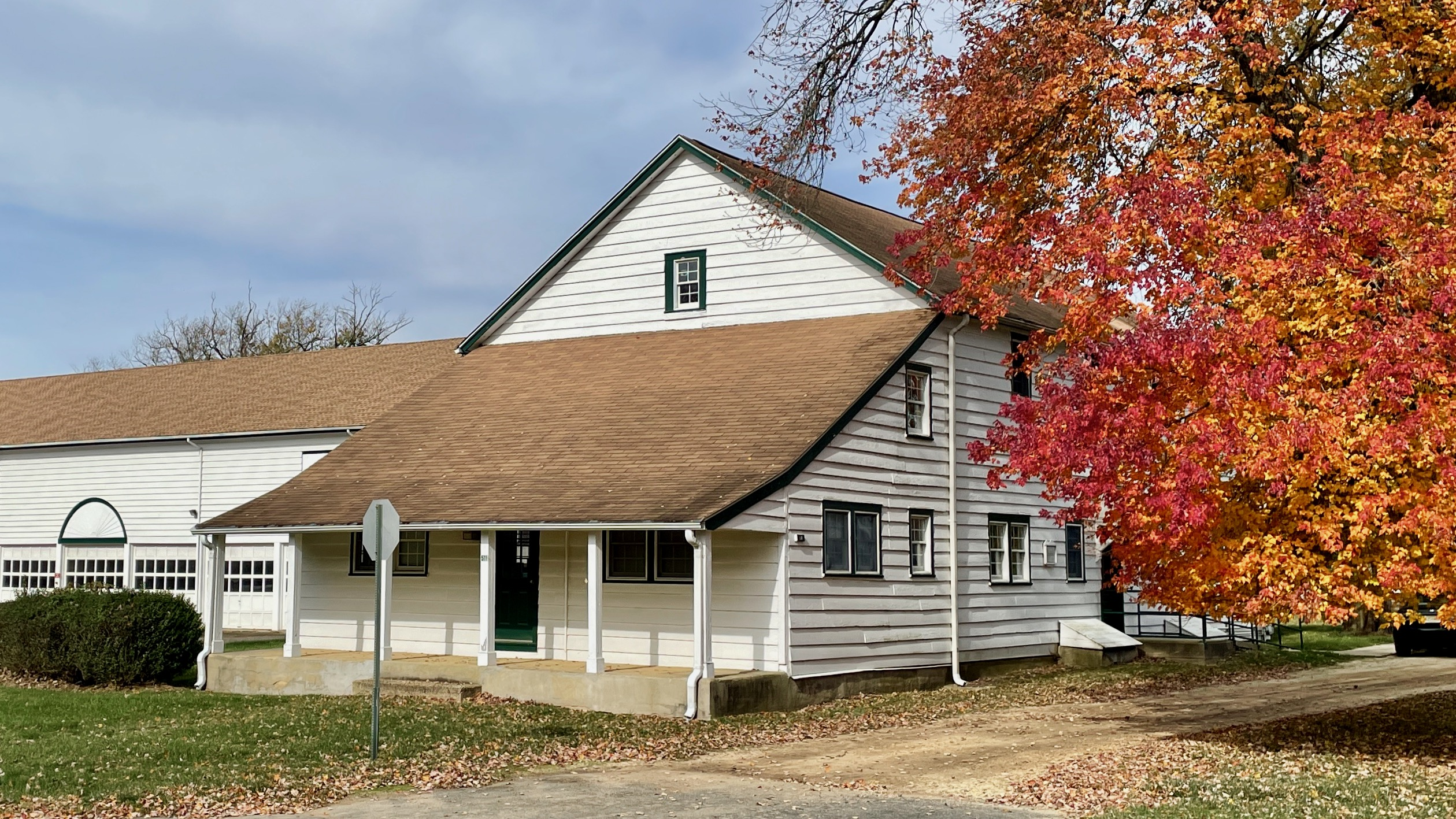
Lloyd Barn (right) and Ten Mare Barn (left)

== Transportation ==
New Jersey Transit offers local bus service on the 833 route. NJ Transit train service on the North Jersey Coast Line is available at the Red Bank station.

== Sports ==
The Jersey Shore Breaks of The Basketball League (TBL) have played at Brookdale Community College since 2025.

== Notable people ==
People who were born in, residents of, or otherwise closely associated with Lincroft include:

- Sebastian Bach (born 1968), lead singer, Skid Row
- Nicole Byer (born 1986), comedian
- Josh Cohen (born 2001), college basketball player for the USC Trojans
- Vincent Favale (born 1959), co-founder of Comedy Central
- Bob Tucker (born 1945), former professional football player, Minnesota Vikings and New York Giants
