= Staatsburg, New York =

- Hamlet and CDP
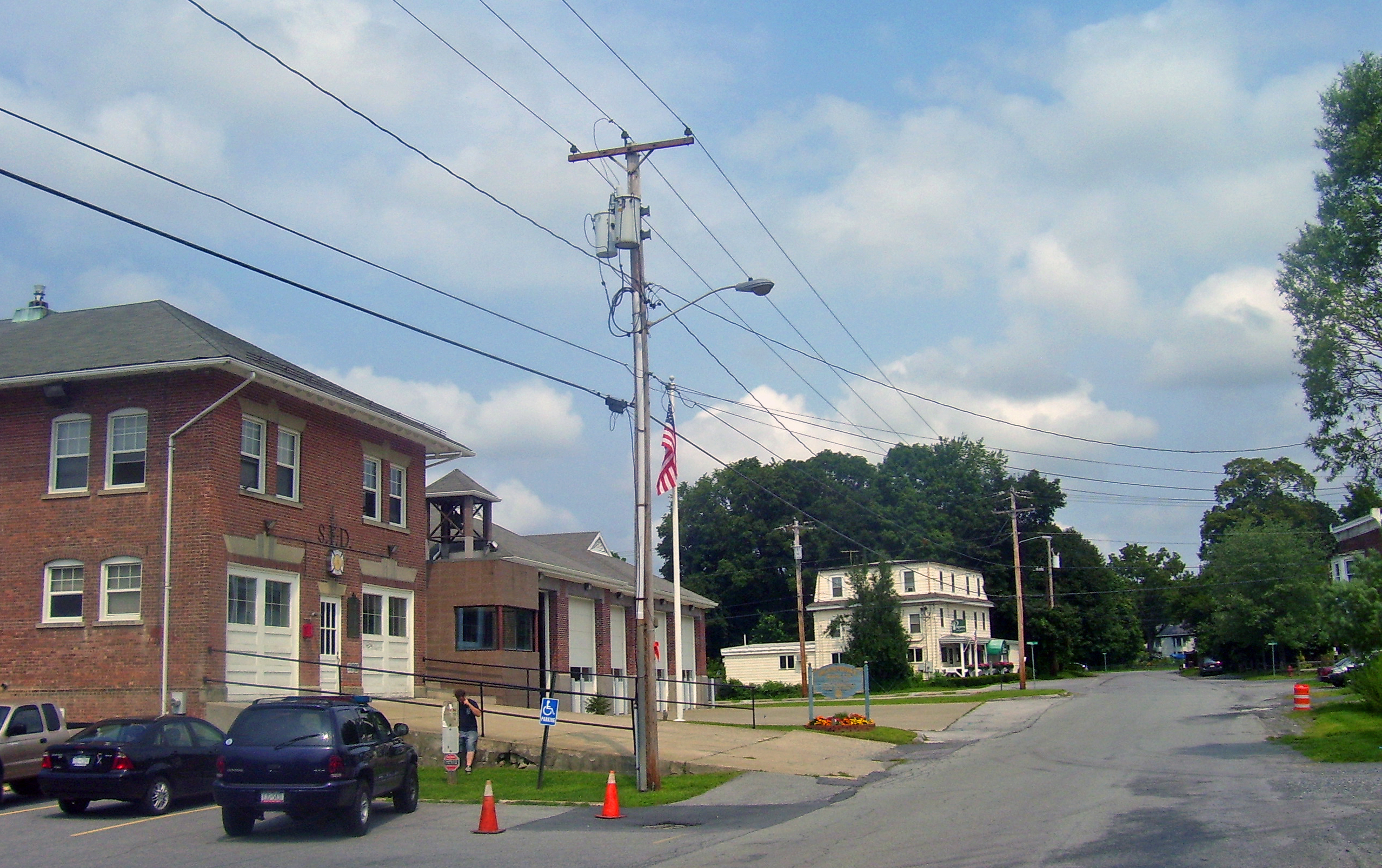
- Downtown Staatsburg

- Location of Staatsburg, New York
- Coordinates: 41°51′10″N 73°55′20″W
- Country: United States
- State: New York
- County: Dutchess
- Town: Hyde Park

Area
  - Total: 1.47 sq mi (3.81 km^{2})
  - Land: 1.47 sq mi (3.80 km^{2})
  - Water: 0.0039 sq mi (0.01 km^{2})
- Elevation: 30 ft (9.1 m)

Population (2020)
  - Total: 703
  - Density: 478.8/sq mi (184.86/km^{2})
- Time zone: UTC-5 (Eastern (EST))
  - Summer (DST): UTC-4 (EDT)
- ZIP code: 12580
- Area code: 845
- FIPS code: 36-70552
- GNIS feature ID: 966187

Staatsburg is a hamlet and census-designated place (CDP) in Hyde Park, a town in Dutchess County, New York, United States. The population was 703 at the 2020 census. It is part of the Kiryas Joel–Poughkeepsie–Newburgh metropolitan area as well as the larger New York metropolitan area.

Staatsburg is located in the northwestern corner of Hyde Park and is bordered to the west by the Hudson River.

== History ==
Staatsburg was part of the Pawling-Staats land patent, one of many granted by the English colonial government in the 1690s with the intention of encouraging more colonials to settle in the sparsely populated Hudson Valley. The original patent was made to Henry Pawling. Subsequently, a large portion of the patent was purchased by Dr. Samuel Staats, a surgeon of Dutch origins who resided in New York City. He and Dirck Vanderburgh bought it for 130 pounds from Pawling's widow. As a result of the combination of their names, the area came to be known as "Staatsburgh". The concluding "h" in the name appears to have been dropped in 1890 as part of the United States Board on Geographic Names' standardization efforts.

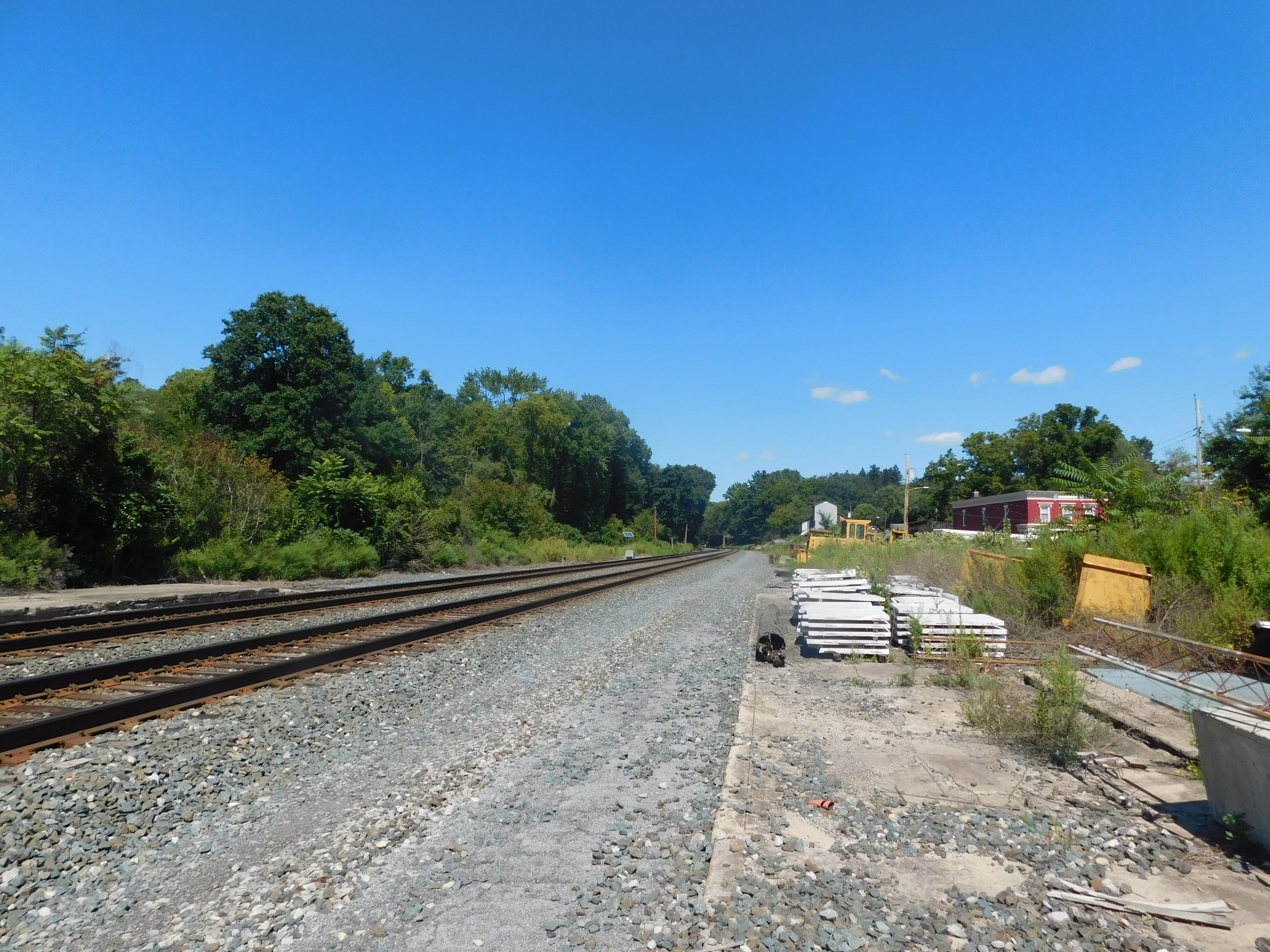
The former New York Central Railroad station site in Staatsburg in August 2026. The station depot was demolished in 1960

Staatsburg formerly had a station on the New York Central Railroad that opened on February 2, 1913, replacing an older structure. The station depot caught fire in March 1959 and was razed in 1960 after becoming a public hazard.

== Geography ==
Staatsburg is located at 41°51′10″N 73°55′20″W. According to the United States Census Bureau, the CDP has a total area of 1.1 square miles (2.8 km^{2}), all land.

== Historic and notable sites ==
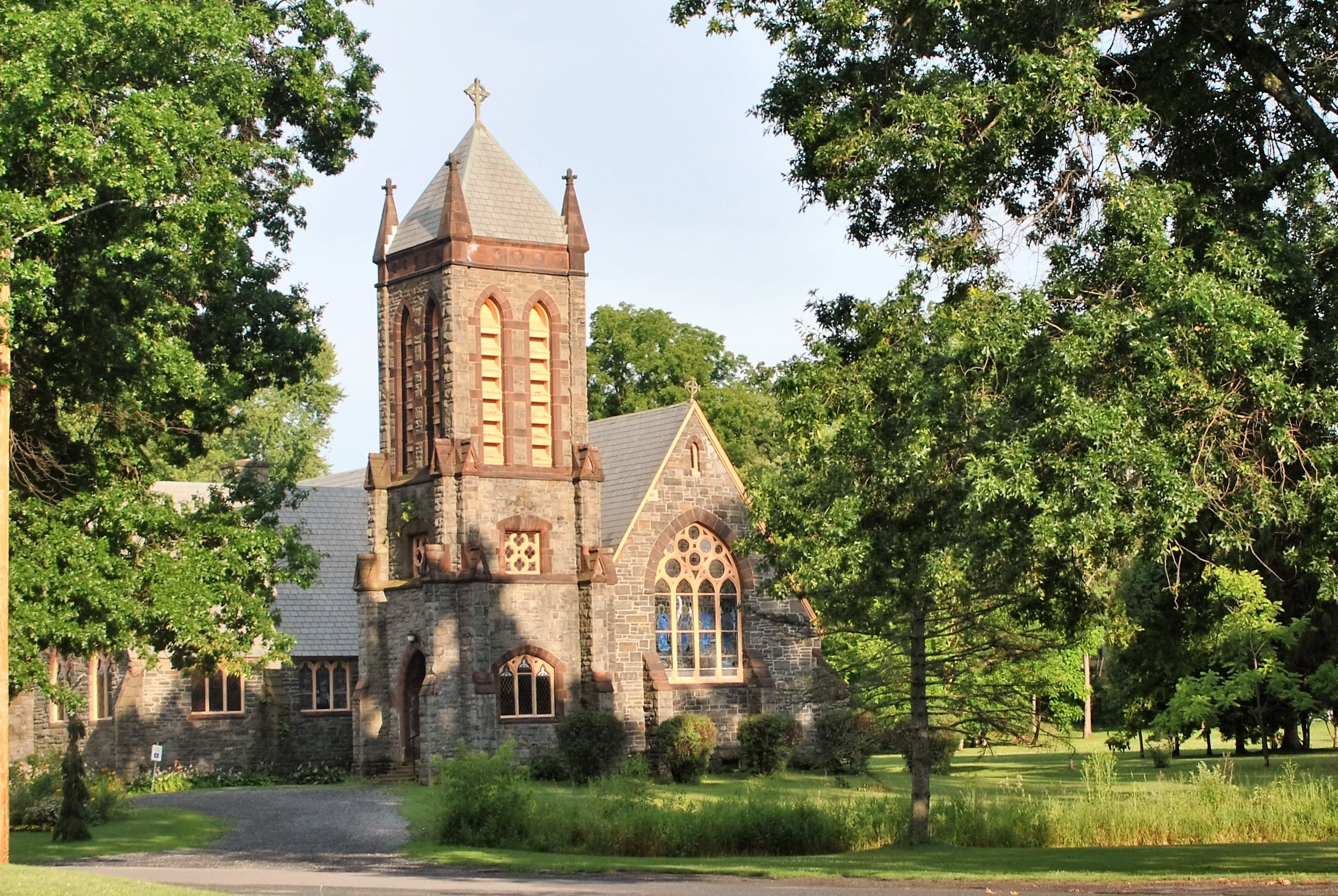
St. Margaret's Episcopal Church in Staatsburg

The Staatsburgh State Historic Site preserves a Beaux-Arts mansion designed by McKim, Mead, and White and the home's surrounding landscape. The historic site is located within Ogden Mills & Ruth Livingston Mills State Park.

Staatsburg is bordered to the southwest by Margaret Lewis Norrie State Park. There are many scenic views of the Hudson River, making it attractive for camping, walking, hiking, jogging and cycling. Tent sites and cabins are available. Campers with boats have river access through a marina. The park is easily accessible from US 9 and the New York State Thruway (cross the Kingston–Rhinecliff Bridge).

The John Hendricks House in the southern section of Staatsburg was built in 1785 and remains as it was then. It is believed to have been an inn on the Albany Post Road. It is listed on the National Register of Historic Places.

St. Margaret's Episcopal Church was designed by Richard M. Upjohn in 1892.

== Demographics ==
Historical population
Census	Pop.	Note	%±
2020	703		—
U.S. Decennial Census

As of the census of 2000, there were 911 people, 345 households, and 245 families residing in the CDP. The population density was 460.6 inhabitants per square mile (177.8/km^{2}). There were 360 housing units at an average density of 182.0 per square mile (70.3/km^{2}). The racial makeup of the CDP was 90.78% White, 5.27% African American, 1.10% Asian, 0.22% Pacific Islander, 1.10% from other races, and 1.54% from two or more races. Hispanic or Latino of any race were 2.09% of the population.

There were 345 households, out of which 29.6% had children under the age of 18 living with them, 59.4% were married couples living together, 9.0% had a female householder with no husband present. 22.9% of all households were made up of individuals, and 8.1% had someone living alone who was 65 years of age or older. The average household size was 2.61 and the average family size was 3.08.

In the CDP, the population was spread out, with 24.6% under the age of 18, 7.6% from 18 to 24, 28.1% from 25 to 44, 29.6% from 45 to 64, and 10.1% who were 65 years of age or older. The median age was 39 years. For every 100 females, there were 94.7 males. For every 100 females age 18 and over, there were 94.1 males.

The median income for a household in the CDP was $59,375, and the median income for a family was $63,182. Males had a median income of $50,313 versus $26,696 for females. The per capita income for the CDP was $26,564. About 8.3% of families and 9.2% of the population were below the poverty threshold, including 9.1% of those under age 18 and 7.9% of those age 65 or over.

== Points of interest ==
Along with hosting music in the parks every other Wednesday during the summer months, Mills Mansion hosted the first Hudson Valley Green Festival in September 2010.

- Dinsmore Golf Course
