= Bill Kunkel =

Bill Kunkel may refer to:

- Bill Kunkel (journalist) (1950–2011), editor of Electronic Games and Tips & Tricks magazines
- Bill Kunkel (baseball) (1936–1985), Major League Baseball pitcher and umpire
