= Howard Barbieri =

American football player (born 1987)

No. 74, 63
- Position: Guard

Personal information
- Born: November 7, 1987 (age 38); Leonardo, New Jersey, U.S.
- Listed height: 6 ft 5 in (1.96 m)
- Listed weight: 300 lb (136 kg)

Career information
- College: Rutgers
- NFL draft: 2011: undrafted

Career history
- Houston Texans (2011)*; Baltimore Ravens (2012)*; Tampa Bay Buccaneers (2013)*
- * Offseason or practice squad member only
- Stats at Pro Football Reference

Howard Barbieri (born November 7, 1987) is an American former football guard. He played college football at Rutgers.

Raised in Middletown Township, New Jersey, Barbieri played on the defensive line for the football team at Middletown High School South.

== College career ==
Barbieri played college football at Rutgers.

== Professional career ==
=== Tampa Bay Buccaneers ===
Barbieri signed with the Tampa Bay Buccaneers on July 31, 2013. Barbieri was waived on August 13, 2013.
