= Claudia Vázquez =

Puerto Rican footballer

Personal information
- Full name: Claudia Vázquez Lippi
- Date of birth: 2 November 1990 (age 35)
- Place of birth: Puerto Rico
- Height: 1.65 m (5 ft 5 in)
- Positions: Forward; midfielder

Youth career
- Middletown High School North

College career
Years	Team	Apps	(Gls)
2009–2012	Monmouth Hawks	50	(1)

International career^{‡}
2010	Puerto Rico	5	(0)
- ‡ National team caps and goals as of 1 August 2010

Claudia Vázquez Lippi (born 2 November 1990) is a Puerto Rican retired footballer who has played as a forward and a midfielder. She has been a member of the Puerto Rico women's national team.

== Early and personal life ==
Vázquez was raised in Belford, New Jersey.
