= Thomas Gray (soccer) =

American soccer player

Personal information
- Date of birth: August 12, 1986 (age 40)
- Place of birth: Red Bank, New Jersey, United States
- Height: 5 ft 8 in (1.73 m)
- Position: Midfielder

Youth career
- 2004: Rutgers Scarlet Knights
- 2005–2007: Monmouth Hawks

Senior career*
Years	Team	Apps	(Gls)
2008	Newark Ironbound Express	0	(0)
2009–2011	Pittsburgh Riverhounds	62	(5)
- * Club domestic league appearances and goals as of June 10, 2011

Thomas Gray (born August 12, 1986, in Red Bank, New Jersey) is an American soccer player.

== Career ==
=== College ===
Gray attended Middletown High School South, played club ball with the Middletown Sonics as #7 (winning three state championships and one regional title in nine years) and played one year of college soccer for Rutgers University before transferring to Monmouth University as a sophomore. At Monmouth he was named to the First Team and Second Team of the Northeast Conference. In his junior year, Gray also led the nation in total assists.

In 2008, he was also on the roster of Newark Ironbound Express of the USL Premier Development League, but did not feature in any games due to a persistent injury.

=== Professional ===
Gray turned professional in 2009 when he signed with the Pittsburgh Riverhounds in the USL Second Division. He made his professional debut on April 17, 2009, in Pittsburgh's opening day 0–0 tie with Crystal Palace Baltimore. On March 8, 2010, Pittsburgh announced the re-signing of Gray to a new contract for the 2010 season.
