= Tom Hanson (American football) =

American football player (1907–1970)

Profile
- Positions: Halfback, Quarterback

Personal information
- Born: November 10, 1907; Navesink, New Jersey, U.S.
- Died: August 5, 1970 (aged 62); Philadelphia, Pennsylvania, U.S.

Career information
- High school: Leonardo (Middletown Township, New Jersey)
- College: Temple

Career history
- 1931: Brooklyn Dodgers
- 1932: Staten Island Stapletons
- 1933–37: Philadelphia Eagles
- 1938: Pittsburgh Pirates

Career statistics
- Rushing yards: 2,122
- Rushing touchdowns: 13
- Receiving yards: 325
- Receiving touchdowns: 1
- Pass attempts: 68
- Pass completions: 14
- Completion percentage: 20.6%
- TD–INT: 0–13
- Passer rating: 0

Thomas Tucker "Swede" Hanson (November 10, 1907 – August 5, 1970) was an American football halfback and quarterback in the National Football League (NFL), mainly for the Philadelphia Eagles, for whom he caught the first touchdown in franchise history. He also played for the Brooklyn Dodgers, Staten Island Stapletons, and Pittsburgh Pirates. Hanson played college football at Temple University.

== Early life ==
Born and raised in the Navesink section of Middletown Township, New Jersey, Hanson attended Leonardo High School (which currently is known as Middletown High School North), where he started playing varsity level high school athletics while he was in the seventh grade; he would also play both baseball and basketball in high school. As a sophomore in the 1925 season, Hanson led Leonardo High School to the school's first state championship, finishing the regular season with an 8–0 record, until they lost the postseason Class B playoff championship game by a score of 20-0 played in front of 3,000 fans at Rutgers University against a Rahway High School team that had been undefeated for three consecutive seasons. As a junior in 1926, Hanson was part of the Leonardo team that won its second consecutive state title, with wins that included a 40–0 victory against Rahway that ended the school's win streak.

== College playing ==
At Temple University, Hanson scored the winning touchdown on a 76-yard punt return to lead the team to a 7–6 victory against heavily favored Bucknell College, tackling future Hall-of-Famer Clarke Hinkle late in the game to preserve the win. Hanson scored 80 points as a running back for the Owls during the 1927 season, including four touchdowns and four extra points he scored in a single game that Temple won by a score of 110–0 against Blue Ridge College; Temple led Blue Ridge by a score of 78–0 at halftime and loaned three players to the losing side during the second half, when quarters were shortened to five minutes. Hanson also competed in intercollegiate boxing at Temple.

== Professional career ==
Hanson went professional in 1931, playing for the Brooklyn Dodgers, before moving over to the Staten Island Stapletons for the next season. Bert Bell took over the bankrupt Stapletons and relocated the franchise to Philadelphia in 1933. On October 29, 1933, Hanson scored the first touchdown in Eagles franchise history in Green Bay against the Packers on a 35-yard pass from Roger Randolph "Red" Kirkman. Hanson led the Eagles in rushing during the 1933–1936 seasons and finished second in the league in 1934 to Beattie Feathers. Traded to the Pittsburgh Pirates in 1938, he was a teammate of Byron White, who would later serve as an Associate Justice on the United States Supreme Court.

After leaving football, he worked as a mechanic at the Philadelphia Naval Shipyard.

== Death ==
Hanson died in Philadelphia at the age of 62 at Einstein Medical Center and was survived by his wife, Delores.
