= Dempsey Pump House =

- U.S. National Register of Historic Places
- New Jersey Register of Historic Places
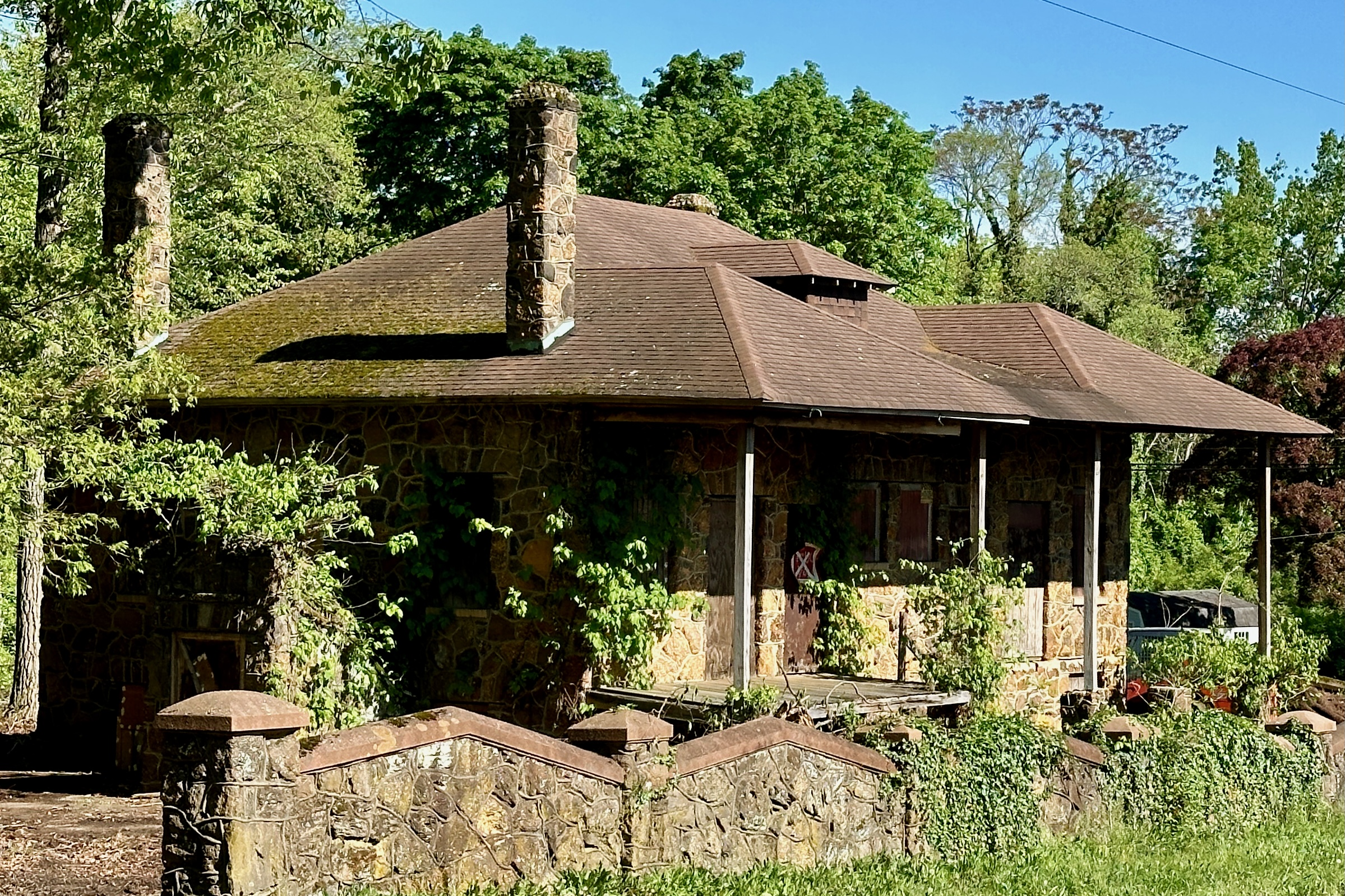

- Location within Monmouth County, New Jersey Location within New Jersey Location within the United States
- Location: 55 Hamilton Avenue, Leonardo, New Jersey
- Coordinates: 40°25′6.5″N 74°3′33″W
- Area: 5 acres (2.0 ha)
- Built: 1926
- NRHP reference No.: 100010171
- NJRHP No.: 5236

Significant dates
- Added to NRHP: April 11, 2024
- Designated NJRHP: February 22, 2024

The Dempsey Pump House is located at 55 Hamilton Avenue in the Leonardo section of Middletown Township in Monmouth County, New Jersey, United States. The historic pump house was built in 1926 and was also used as playroom and community space. William Dempsey purchased the property in 1920. The township purchased the 5-acre (2.0 ha) site in 2004. It was added to the National Register of Historic Places on April 11, 2024.

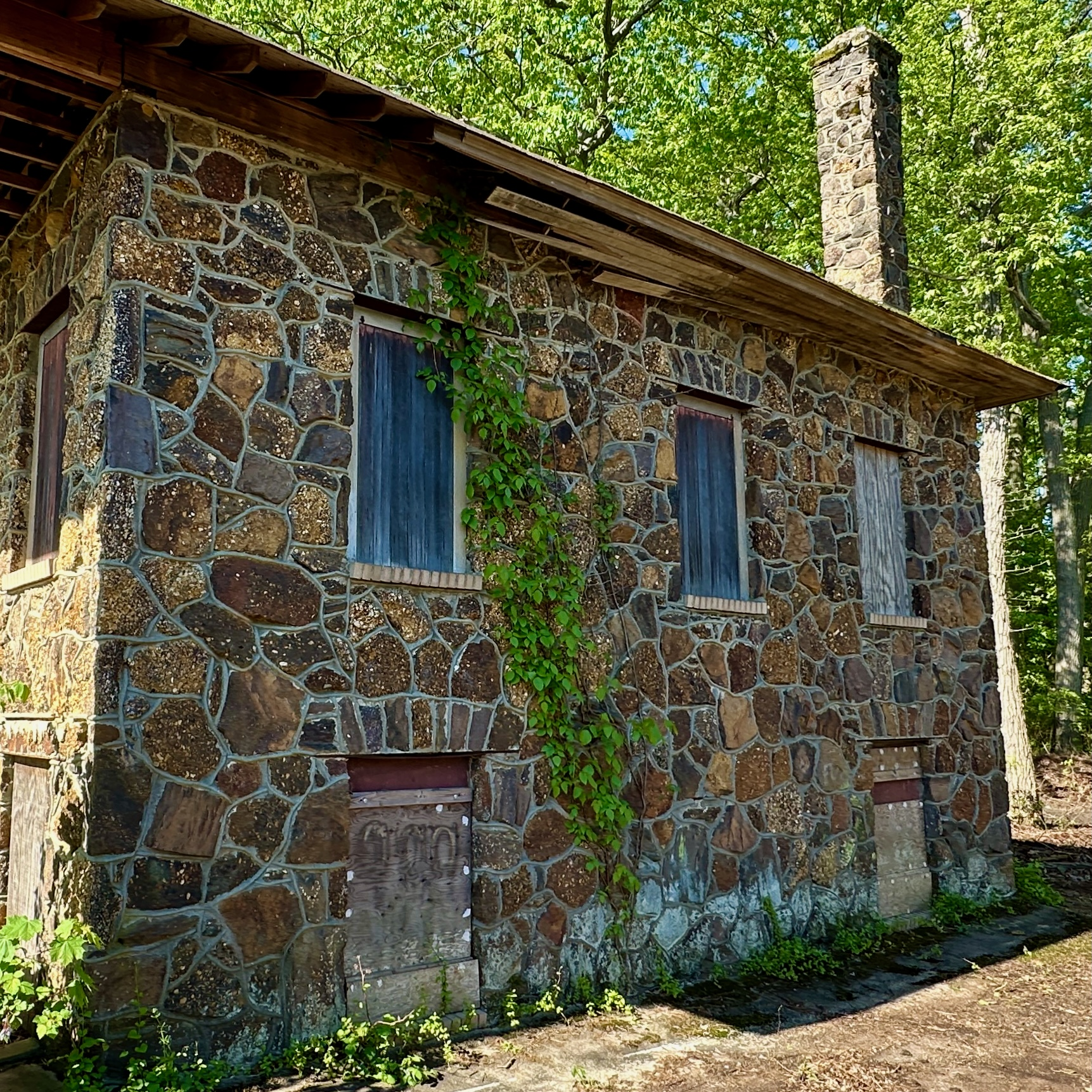
Stonework

== See also ==
- National Register of Historic Places listings in Monmouth County, New Jersey
