= Jeff Kunkel =

American baseball player (born 1962)

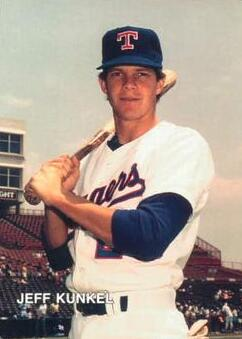
- Kunkel with the Texas Rangers c. 1987
- Shortstop
- Born: March 25, 1962 (age 64); West Palm Beach, Florida, U.S.
- Batted: Right Threw: Right

MLB debut
- July 23, 1984, for the Texas Rangers

Last MLB appearance
- September 14, 1992, for the Chicago Cubs

MLB statistics
- Batting average: .221
- Home runs: 18
- Runs batted in: 73
- Stats at Baseball Reference

Teams
- Texas Rangers (1984–1991); Chicago Cubs (1992)

Jeffrey William Kunkel (born March 25, 1962) is an American former shortstop in Major League Baseball with the Texas Rangers and Chicago Cubs.

The son of the late American League pitcher and umpire Bill Kunkel, after receiving All-American honors as a shortstop, he was chosen in the first round (3rd overall) of the 1983 Major League Baseball draft out of Rider University.

Growing up in the Leonardo section of Middletown Township, New Jersey, Kunkel was an all-around athlete who participated in soccer, basketball and baseball during his high school years at Middletown High School South in New Jersey. He was selected as #74 of the top 100 Jersey Shore athletes of the millennium by the Asbury Park Press in 1999.

Kunkel reached the big leagues quickly, but never developed into a full-time player. The Rangers gave him the opportunity to win the starting shortstop position, but he was always thwarted by his hitting stats and obstacles such as Curtis Wilkerson, Scott Fletcher, Fred Manrique, Gary Green, and Jeff Huson.

Plagued with numerous potential career-ending injuries, Kunkel worked hard to rehabilitate himself to finish an 11-year professional baseball career with 5½ years in the major leagues.

A versatile player with the ability to play 8 of the 9 positions on the field, he actually pitched three times in mop-up stints.

== 1984 debut ==
Kunkel made his major league debut against the defending world champion Baltimore Orioles at Arlington Stadium on Monday, July 23, 1984. Against O's ace Mike Boddicker, a 20-game winner that season, Kunkel recorded three hits and stole second base. Nevertheless, the Rangers lost the game, 9–5.

Kunkel spent the rest of the season alternating with Curtis Wilkerson, but was never able to duplicate the success of his first game. He concluded 1984 with 3 home runs, 7 runs batted in, and a .204 average in 50 games and 142 at-bats.

== Time in the minors ==
After struggling during spring training in 1985, Kunkel found little playing time with the Rangers over the next four seasons. He spent most of his time with the Oklahoma City 89ers of the Triple-A American Association and was recalled to the majors only due to other players being hurt or the rosters expanding in September.

== Best year ==
In 1989 Kunkel recorded his best season, and more playing time opened for him due to the trade of Scott Fletcher to the Chicago White Sox. He responded by hitting a career-high .270 with 8 home runs and 29 RBI in 108 games. The success was short-lived, and by 1990 he was back to his previous role as a reserve player.

== Last seasons ==
In 1992, the Chicago Cubs gave Kunkel his last shot in the majors. He assumed the role as a utility player, receiving very limited playing time behind Ryne Sandberg and Shawon Dunston. Jeff concluded his short stay with the Cubs hitting .138 in 29 at-bats and never played in the big leagues again.

In 1993, Jeff signed a minor league contract with the Cleveland Indians and played infield and outfield for the AAA International League Champion Charlotte Knights.

In 1994, Kunkel joined the Detroit Tigers' AAA team, the Toledo Mud Hens, where he finished his professional baseball career hitting .249 with 11 hrs.

== See also ==
- List of second-generation Major League Baseball players
