= Middletown High School South =

High school in Monmouth County, New Jersey, US

Location
- 900 Nut Swamp Road; Middletown Township, Monmouth County, New Jersey 07748; United States; 40.363183°N 74.113567°W

Information
- Type: Public high school
- Established: September 1976
- School district: Middletown Township Public School District
- NCES School ID: 341011003978
- Principal: Thomas Olausen
- Faculty: 113.7 FTEs
- Enrollment: 1,406 (as of 2024–25)
- Student to teacher ratio: 12.4:1
- Colors: Navy Blue and Silver Grey
- Athletics conference: Shore Conference
- Team name: Eagles
- Rival: Middletown High School North
- Accreditation: Middle States Association of Colleges and Schools
- Newspaper: The Eagle Eye
- Yearbook: Aquiline
- Website: south.middletownk12.org

Middletown High School South is a four-year comprehensive public high school located in Middletown Township, in Monmouth County, in the U.S. state of New Jersey, serving students in ninth through twelfth grades as one of the two secondary schools of the Middletown Township Public School District. The other school in the district is Middletown High School North. The school has been accredited by the Middle States Association of Colleges and Schools Commission on Elementary and Secondary Schools since 1977; the school's accreditation expires in July 2025.

As of the 2024–25 school year, the school had an enrollment of 1,406 students and 113.7 classroom teachers (on an FTE basis), for a student–teacher ratio of 12.4:1. There were 99 students (7.0% of enrollment) eligible for free lunch and 10 (0.7% of students) eligible for reduced-cost lunch.

== History ==
Constructed at a cost of $8.7 million (equivalent to $49.2 million in 2025) on an 80-acre (32 ha) site, the 230,000-square-foot (21,000 m^{2}) school building was designed to accommodate 1,800 students. The school opened its new building in September 1976 for more than 1,400 students, after spending the 1975–76 school year as a school-within-a-school inside Middletown High School North.

Middletown South and the Middletown School District received national attention in fall 2001 when its teachers, members of the Middletown Township Education Association, went on strike for the second time in three years. The strike disrupted classes for several days, and hundreds of teachers were put in jail. A group of 228 teachers and other school workers were sent to jail in December 2001, marking that largest such action against school staff in over two decades, though they were released after agreeing to submit their differences with the school district to non-binding arbitration. After the strike, many members of the union leadership stepped down. There has not been a strike since 2001.

In October 2006, the Board of Education of the Middletown Township Public School District voted on a random drug testing procedure that would require all students in extracurricular activities or with a parking space at the high school to submit their name to a pool for random selection.

== Awards, recognition and rankings ==
In its listing of "America's Best High Schools 2016", the school was ranked 497th out of 500 best high schools in the country; it was ranked 51st among all high schools in New Jersey and 34th among the state's non-magnet schools.

The school was the 92nd-ranked public high school in New Jersey out of 339 schools statewide in New Jersey Monthly magazine's September 2014 cover story on the state's "Top Public High Schools", using a new ranking methodology. The school had been ranked 105th in the state of 328 schools in 2012, after being ranked 95th in 2010 out of 322 schools listed. The magazine ranked the school 92nd in 2008 out of 316 schools. Schooldigger.com ranked the school 57th out of 381 public high schools statewide in its 2011 rankings (an increase of 17 positions from the 2010 ranking) which were based on the combined percentage of students classified as proficient or above proficient on the mathematics (91.5%) and language arts literacy (96.7%) components of the High School Proficiency Assessment (HSPA).

== Athletics ==
The Middletown High School South Eagles compete in Division A North of the Shore Conference, an athletic conference comprised of public and private high schools in Monmouth County and Ocean County along the Jersey Shore. The conference operates under the jurisdiction of the New Jersey State Interscholastic Athletic Association (NJSIAA). With 1,096 students in grades 10–12, the school was classified by the NJSIAA for the 2019–20 school year as Group IV for most athletic competition purposes, which included schools with an enrollment of 1,060 to 5,049 students in that grade range. The school was classified by the NJSIAA as Group IV South for football for 2024–2026, which included schools with 890 to 1,298 students.

In 2015, to commemorate the 100-year anniversary of football in Middletown, alumni of North and South high schools played each other; The Middletown North Lion football alumni defeated the Middletown South alumni 6–3 at The Swamp, to claim the victory in what was the first-ever game of its kind in Middletown. Each year, students, parents, teachers, alumni, and administrators gather for the annual Thanksgiving Day football game between Middletown North and Middletown South. Middletown South holds the overall lead with a head-to-head record of 37–13–1 through the 2025 Thanksgiving game.

The football team won the Central Jersey Group IV state sectional title in 1989, 1990, 1992 and 1995; won in Central Jersey Group III in 2001, 2003, 2004 and 2006; and won in 2015 in North II Group IV. Middletown South's football program holds ten state sectional championships, 17 Shore Conference Division Championships, 9 undefeated seasons and 29 state playoff berths. The football program holds the Shore Conference record for longest winning streak with 43 straight wins from 2003 to 2006, which was broken with a 19–14 loss in October 2006 to Ocean Township High School. The 1989 team finished the season with an 11–0 record and was ranked 13th in the nation by USA Today after defeating Madison Central High School by a score of 22–3 to win the program's first Central Jersey Group IV title. The 1990 team won the North II Group IV sectional title with a 15–14 win against Trenton Central High School in the championship game. In the 1995 Central Jersey Group IV final at Giants Stadium, the team defeated Piscataway High School by a score of 28–10 to finish the season with an 11–0 record. The 2001 team finished the season with a record of 12-0 after winning the Central Jersey Group IV sectional title with a 15–14 win against Hamilton High School West in the tournament final. In 2004, The Eagles were ranked #1 in the state of New Jersey unanimously by Gannett New Jersey, The Star-Ledger, and News 12 New Jersey polls. The team was selected again in 2005 and in 2015 as the winner of the Star-Ledger Trophy, recognizing the best team in the state. Middletown South's head coach is Steve Antonucci who had a career record of 149-34 as of November 2013. Middletown South was the high school of Knowshon Moreno, who was the 12th pick of the 2009 NFL draft. NJ.com listed the rivalry between Middletown North and South as 11th best in their 2017 list "Ranking the 31 fiercest rivalries in N.J. HS football". Middletown South holds the overall lead with a head-to-head record of 37–13–1 through the 2025 season.

The field hockey team won the Central Jersey Group IV state sectional title in 1980, 1982 and 1995.

The Middletown South baseball program has also been recognized for their success in the 1990s. During Head Coach Steve Antonucci's tenure which started in 1996, the Eagles won two Central Jersey State Titles (1996 and 1999) and completed the first undefeated season in Shore Conference A-North history with a 14–0 record. The Eagles were led by Darren Fenster to a 25–3 record. The baseball team won the Group IV state championship in 1996 (defeating Bloomfield High School in the tournament final) and 2021 (vs. Montclair High School). In 1999, the Eagles won the A-North, Monmouth County and Central Jersey state championships. The 1999 squad featured many talented players including Asbury Park Press Player of the Year Jarrett Sues, who set a school record with 21 home runs and earned ten victories on the hill. The Eagles offense was the most potent in the state including the single season home run record as a team. The Eagles were also led by All-State pitcher John Scala (10-1), and All-Shore selections Jon Klopacs (C) and Mark Fitzgerald (SS). Antonucci would continue to lead the Eagles until the conclusion of the 2008 season. The 2011 baseball team won the Monmouth County Tournament and the Central Jersey, Group III title, the program's first since 1999. In 2012, the Eagles clinched the A-North division title.

The softball team won the Group IV state championship in 1995 (vs. Clifton High School), won in Group III in 2002 (vs. Pascack Valley High School), 2009 (vs. Ramapo High School), 2010 (vs. Nutley High School) and 2015 (vs. Sparta High School); the program's five state titles are tied for eighth-most in the state. The program's first title came in 1995 with a 9–4 win against Clifton in the championship game. The team won the Group III state championship in 2015, defeating Sparta High School by a score of 8–1 at Kean University, to win the program's fifth overall group championship. Softball coach Tom Erbig retired at the end of the 2016 season having led the team to 16 sectional championships and five group titles; his career record of 743-231-1 made him the winningest softball coach in the state, a title he earned in 2015 with his 722nd win, surpassing Pete Fick of Hunterdon Central Regional High School.

The girls' tennis team won the Group IV state championship in 1996, defeating Westfield High School in the tournament final. The 1996 team defeated Cherry Hill High School East 3–2 in the semifinal round before defeating Westfield 3–2 in the finals.

The girls' track team won the Group III state indoor relay championships in 1997 and 1998. The team was indoor Group II champion in 1997 and 1999. The team won the spring / outdoor track Group III state title in 1998.

The boys' cross country team won the Group III state championship in 1998.

The girls' cross country team won the Group III in 1998, 2002 and 2019. The team won the Meet of Champions in 1998. They won state sectionals for three consecutive years, 2011, 2012 and 2013.

The girls' soccer team was Group III co-champion with Cranford High School in 2000.

The boys' basketball team did not win a single game in the 2004–05 season. Three years later, during the 2007–08 season, second-year head coach Kevin Cullen led the team to the Central Jersey Group III Sectional Championship with a win over Neptune High School 45–33.

The ice hockey team won Handchen Cup in 2009, 2010 and 2012 (as co-champion).

The girls' basketball team won the Group III state championship in 2015, defeating Northern Valley Regional High School at Old Tappan in the final game of the tournament playoff. The team won the Group III Central Jersey state championship in 2014 with a 38–35 win against Neptune High School in the tournament final.

The boys' golf team won three consecutive Public A North titles from 2021 to 2023.

== Administration ==
The school's principal is Thomas Olausen, whose administration team includes three assistant principals.

== Notable alumni ==
- Howard Barbieri (born 1987), former American football guard
- Alyssa Beckerman (born 1981), former gymnast and balance beam national champion
- Nicole Byer (born 1986), comedian
- Peter Dobson (born 1964), actor who had a cameo role in Forrest Gump as Elvis Presley
- Darren Fenster (born 1978, class of 1996), manager in the Boston Red Sox minor league system
- Thomas Gray (born 1986), former professional soccer player who played for the Newark Ironbound Express and Pittsburgh Riverhounds SC
- Josh Heald (born 1977), screenwriter, director, and producer best known for his work on Cobra Kai and Hot Tub Time Machine.
- Jeff Kunkel (born 1962), former MLB shortstop who played for the Texas Rangers and Chicago Cubs
- Rick Lovato (born 1992), long snapper for the Philadelphia Eagles of the National Football League (NFL)
- Brian Lynch (born 1973), film and comic book writer best known for writing the screenplays for Minions and The Secret Life of Pets.
- Melanie McGuire (born 1972), responsible for the "suitcase murder" of April 2004
- Knowshon Moreno (born 1987), former NFL running back
- Olivia Nuzzi (born 1993), political journalist
- Christian Peter (born 1972), former NFL defensive tackle
- Jason Peter (born 1974), former NFL football player
- Moqut Ruffins (born 1984), offensive lineman for the Jacksonville Sharks of the Arena Football League
- Scott Simonson (born 1992), tight end who played in the NFL for the New York Giants
- Luke Wafle, college football defensive end for the USC Trojans who transferred out of the school after his sophomore year
