= Middletown High School North =

High school in Monmouth County, New Jersey, US

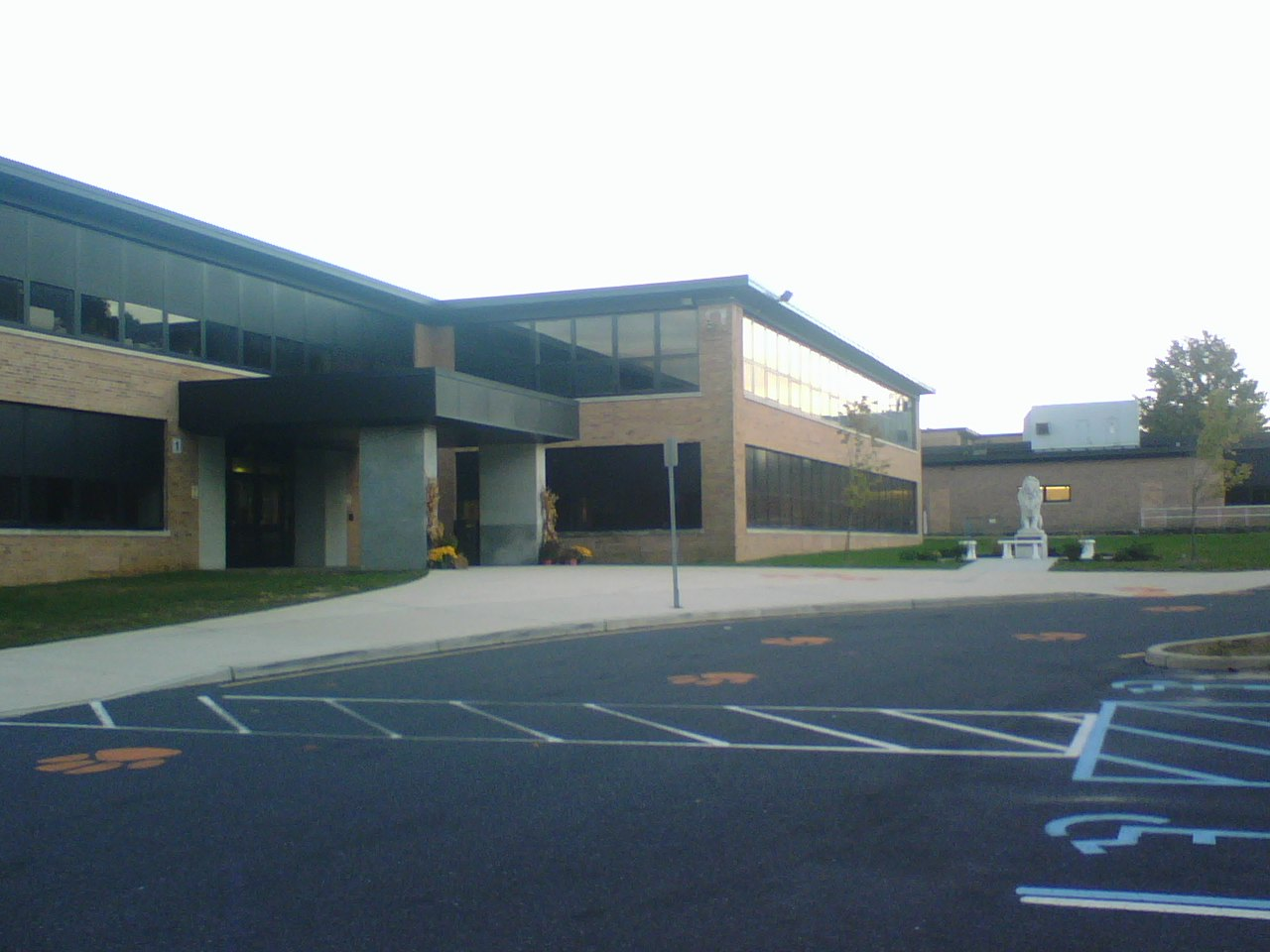

Location
- 63 Tindall Road; Middletown Township, Monmouth County, New Jersey 07748; United States; 40.401574°N 74.10036°W

Information
- Type: Public high school
- Established: 1966
- Authority: Middletown Township Public School District
- NCES School ID: 341011003976
- Principal: Matthew Ferri
- Faculty: 104.1 FTEs
- Grades: 9-12
- Enrollment: 1,289 (as of 2024–25)
- Student to teacher ratio: 12.4:1
- Colors: Orange and Black
- Athletics conference: Shore Conference
- Team name: Lions
- Rival: Middletown High School South
- Accreditation: Middle States Association of Colleges and Schools
- Publication: Viewpoint
- Newspaper: The Lion's Roar
- Yearbook: Polaris
- Website: north.middletownk12.org

Middletown High School North, home of the Lions, is a four-year comprehensive public high school located in Middletown Township, in Monmouth County, in the U.S. state of New Jersey, serving students in ninth through twelfth grades as one of the two secondary schools of the Middletown Township Public School District. Other students from Middletown Township attend Middletown High School South. The school also houses a 750-seat theater. Approximately 90% of North students attend college after graduation. The school has been accredited by the Middle States Association of Colleges and Schools Commission on Elementary and Secondary Schools since 1936; the school's accreditation expires in July 2025.

As of the 2024–25 school year, the school had an enrollment of 1,289 students and 104.1 classroom teachers (on an FTE basis), for a student–teacher ratio of 12.4:1. There were 237 students (18.4% of enrollment) eligible for free lunch and 43 (3.3% of students) eligible for reduced-cost lunch.

== History ==
Originally known as Leonardo High School, starting in 1966 Middletown High School North was known as Middletown Township High School until the year 1976 when Middletown South opened to address overcrowding.

In 1948 in the physical education classes, black students were grouped together for line dancing while white students were organized by height.

== Awards, recognition and rankings ==
The school was the 136th-ranked public high school in New Jersey out of 339 schools statewide in New Jersey Monthly magazine's September 2014 cover story on the state's "Top Public High Schools", using a new ranking methodology. The school had been ranked 128th in the state of 328 schools in 2012, after being ranked 159th in 2010 out of 322 schools listed. The magazine ranked the school 143rd in 2008 out of 316 schools. The school was ranked 164th in the magazine's September 2006 issue, which surveyed 316 schools across the state. Schooldigger.com ranked the school tied for 93rd out of 381 public high schools statewide in its 2011 rankings (an increase of 73 positions from the 2010 ranking) which were based on the combined percentage of students classified as proficient or above proficient on the mathematics (87.4%) and language arts literacy (96.4%) components of the High School Proficiency Assessment (HSPA).

== Athletics ==
The Middletown High School North Lions compete in Division A North of the Shore Conference, an athletic conference comprised of public and private high schools in Monmouth and Ocean counties along the Jersey Shore. The conference operates under the jurisdiction of the New Jersey State Interscholastic Athletic Association (NJSIAA). With 1,032 students in grades 10–12, the school was classified by the NJSIAA for the 2019–20 school year as Group III for most athletic competition purposes, which included schools with an enrollment of 761 to 1,058 students in that grade range. The school was classified by the NJSIAA as Group IV South for football for 2024–2026, which included schools with 890 to 1,298 students.

Each year, students, parents, teachers, alumni, and administrators gather for the annual Thanksgiving Day football game between Middletown North and Middletown South. The game is one of the most important events of the year for North students, and a pep rally is held before the game. At halftime, the homecoming court comes to the field to greet the fans. Middletown South holds the overall lead with a head-to-head record of 37–13–1 through the 2025 season. The Lions won their most recent matchup 7–6.

The football team won the Central Jersey Group IV state sectional title in 1983, 1986 and 1996. The 1983 team finished the season with a record of 11-0 after winning the Central Jersey Group IV sectional title on an 88-yard kickoff return to start the second half to defeat Hunterdon Central Regional High School by a score of 6–0 in the playoff finals. The 1996 team beat J. P. Stevens High School by a score of 27–12 to win the Central Jersey Group IV championship game and end the season 7-2-1. The team won the Central Jersey Group IV title in 1996 with a 33–8 win in the championship game played at Giants Stadium against the previously undefeated Hillsborough High School team led by future NFL player Shawn Mayer. Middletown North's football team finished their 2014–15 season with a 7–4 record after losing to state champions and rival Middletown High School South in the second round of the state playoffs; this was Middletown North's first winning season since 2000. Coach Steve Bush was an assistant coach for the Miami Dolphins. In 2015, to commemorate the 100-year anniversary of football in Middletown, alumni of both schools played each other; The Middletown North Lion football alumni defeated the Middletown South alumni 6–3 at The Swamp, to claim the victory in what was the first-ever game of its kind in Middletown. NJ.com listed the rivalry between Middletown North and South as 11th best in their 2017 list "Ranking the 31 fiercest rivalries in N.J. HS football". Middletown South holds the overall lead with a head-to-head record of 37–13–1.

The field hockey team won the Central Jersey Group IV state sectional title in 1978, 1979, 1981 and 1988, and won the North II Group IV title in 2006.

The boys' wrestling team won the Central Jersey Group IV state sectional title in 1996.

The ice hockey team amassed 86 wins in five seasons while reaching the Elite Eight of the NJSIAA Public Ice Hockey Tournament in 2004, 2005, and 2008, and the Frozen Four in 2004. The ice hockey team won the Public B state championship in 2015 and 2023. The team won the Dowd Cup in 2002, 2004 and 2007 and won the Handchen Cup in 2016. The team won the Shore Conference Championship in 2022 and fell short in the Handchen Cup game of the 2022 season. The annual Mayor's Cup game is when the rival schools Middletown North and Middletown South play to win the towns award of the Mayor's Cup, Middletown North now holds the trophy for two years in a row being they won the Mayor's Cup in their 2022 and 2023 season. The team won the 2023 Public B title with a 3-2 win in the championship game against Chatham High School.

The girls' soccer team won the 2005 Central, Group IV state sectional championship, edging Brick Memorial High School by a 2–1 score in the tournament final.

The boys cross country running team won the Group III state championship in 2013.

The baseball team won Group III state championship in 2022, defeating Cranford High School by a score of 5-4 in the finals to finish the season with a record of 21-10.

== Renovation ==
Throughout the late 1990s and early 2000s, the school renovated its teaching facilities. During the renovations, much of the school was inhospitable and sealed off. This resulted in the usage of both the upper and lower gymnasiums partitioned off into several classes, without ceilings.

The renovations were completed sometime in 2004. The new building features standard teaching facilities. The tent outside (the Middletown High School North Bubble) has remained, and is used to house sporting events. A 750-seat professional theater was also installed, which features new lighting and sound systems and hosts various professional events, as was a TV production studio, which broadcasts student produced programs across Middletown and its surrounding boroughs. In 2023-2024 there was a planned renovation of the football field, and track; however this was delayed due to concern's with the contractor.

== SIDS Game ==
For the last six years, the Middletown North Student Council has hosted the annual Megan Biebel Memorial SIDS game to benefit research for Sudden Infant Death Syndrome. The event has raised over $100,000, and has attracted support from celebrities including singer Jon Bon Jovi. The game puts the Middletown North faculty and students up against New Jersey policemen. In recent years, the SIDS game has also held a pre-game carnival. The half-time show includes a performance by a special all-male cheerleading squad, as well as a raffle. The event is held in honor of Megan Biebel, who died of SIDS in March 2000. However, the event is not scheduled to take place in 2007, with Matt Biebel and his wife saying that they no longer wish to.

2007 will bring the "North Carnival," which will be the traditional SIDS event, but raising money for brain cancer charities.

== Teachers strike ==
Middletown North and the Middletown School District received national attention in the fall of 2001 when its teachers, members of the Middletown Township Education Association, went on strike for the second time in three years. The strike disrupted classes for several days, and hundreds of teachers were jailed. After the strike, many members of the union leadership stepped down. There has not been a strike since 2001.

== Performing Arts Center ==
The school's Performing Arts Center ({PAC) can seat 750 people, and houses a professional lighting and sound system. There is no orchestra pit but a full balcony, housing the sound and light systems, is present. The theater hosts cultural and musical events, as well as various drama productions. Several political figures have appeared there.

Notable events hosted at the MHSN PAC, and open to the public, include:

- Middletown High School North Battle of the Bands
- Middletown North vs. South Battle of the Bands
- So, North Thinks it Can Dance
- North Idol
- Middletown Film Festival
- Rockit for Kids Holiday Concert 2006

== Television production ==
For several years Comcast Cable has run the student produced series North in Action, which features student made movies, comedy sketches, music, and news. The series was put on hiatus in 2007, but the program is set to resume for the 2008–2009 school year. The series is filmed in the school's TV production room. Rival Middletown High School South also has a Television program.

New television series are continuously produced within the Middletown High School North TV production center. The studio serves as the main production location for Middletown's Public-access television cable TV station on Comcast channel 20.

== Random drug testing ==
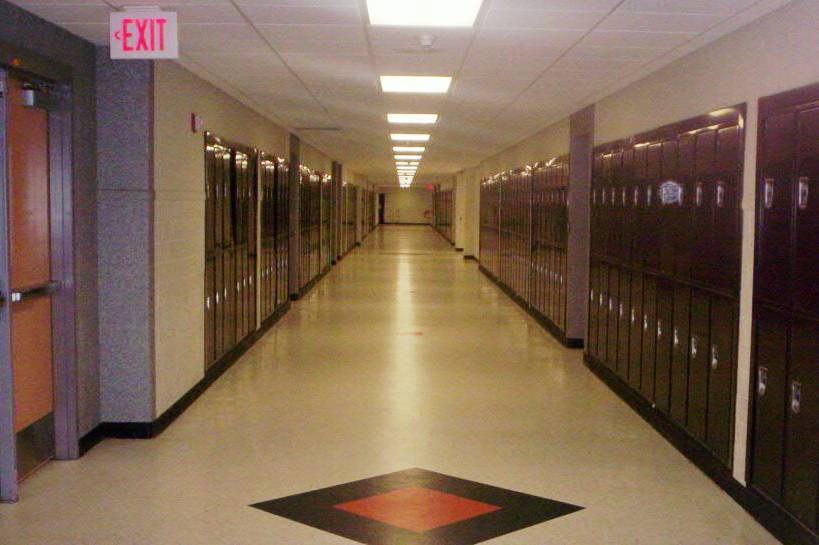
A renovated hallway circa 2007

In October 2006, the Board of Education of the Middletown School District voted on a random drug testing procedure that would require all students in extracurricular activities or with a parking space at either High School to submit their name to a pool for random selection.

Controversy had been raised over the target group for the random drug testing, as many students and faculty believe that students who participate in school activities are less likely to be active with drug and alcohol abuse. However, New Jersey state law prohibits the entirety of the student population be tested, and so the students in after school activities and parking spaces make up a greater majority for the testing pool.

== Administration ==
The school's principal is Matthew Ferri. His administration team includes the school's two assistant principals.

== Notable alumni ==
- Eugene J. Bedell (1928–2016, class of 1946), politician who served in the New Jersey General Assembly from 1972 to 1982
- Shilique Calhoun (born 1992, class of 2011), defensive end for the Oakland Raiders of the National Football League
- Dean Ehehalt (born 1964), head coach of the Monmouth Hawks baseball team
- Tom Hanson (1907-1985, class of 1927), football halfback in the National Football League, mainly for the Philadelphia Eagles, for whom he caught the first touchdown in franchise history
- Ed Jones (born 1952, class of 1970), former defensive back for the Edmonton Eskimos of the Canadian Football League from 1976 to 1984, who won five Grey Cups for the Eskimos and was a CFL All-Star from 1979 to 1981
- John Montefusco (born 1950), ex-major league baseball player who played for the New York Yankees
- Steven Van Zandt (born 1950, class of 1968), musician and actor, best known as a member of Bruce Springsteen's E Street Band,
- Claudia Vázquez (born 1990), footballer who has played as forward and midfielder for the Puerto Rico women's national football team
