= Leonardo, New Jersey =

Populated place in Monmouth County, New Jersey, US

- Census-designated place
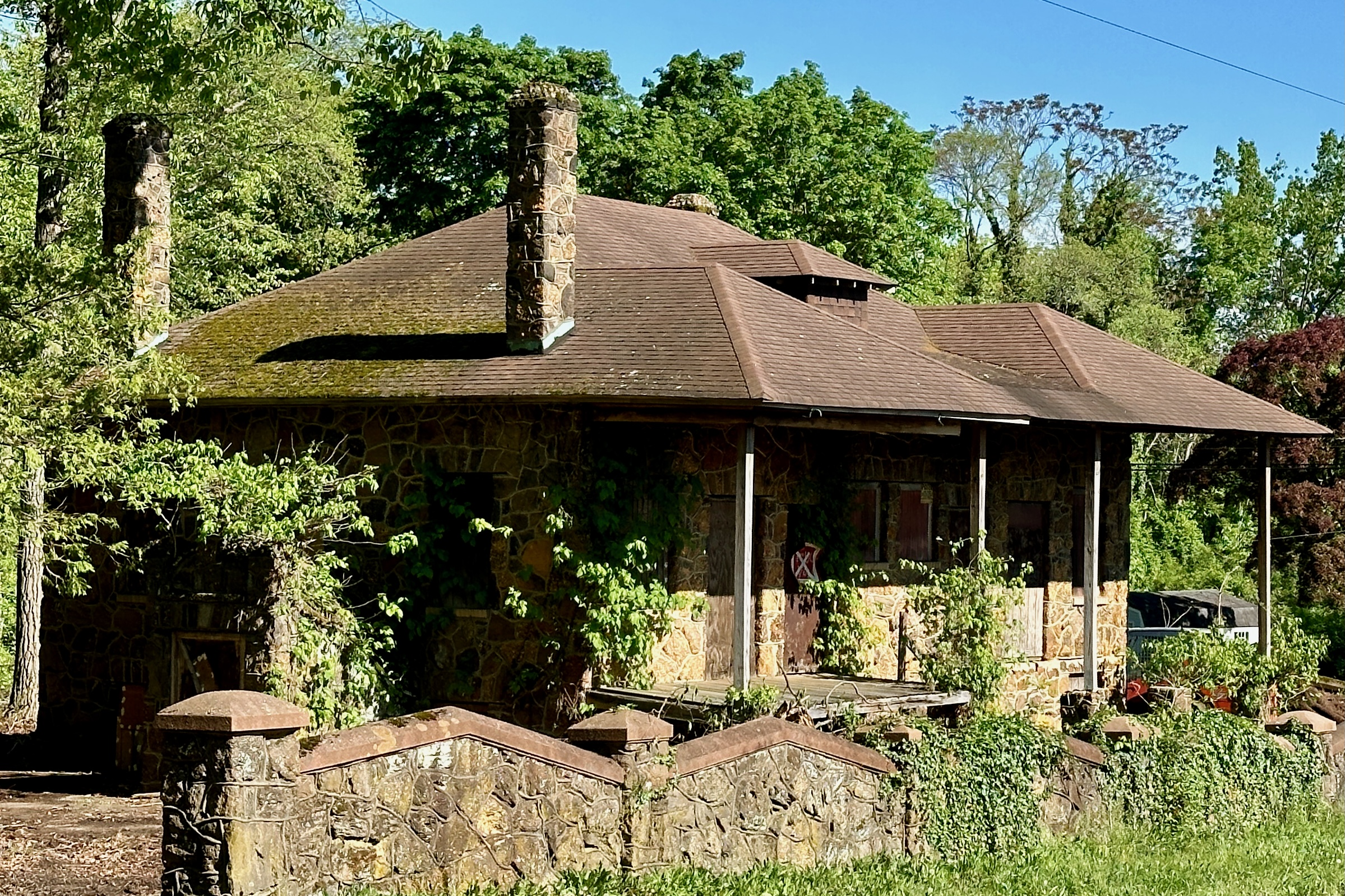
- The Dempsey Pump House

- Location of Leonardo in Monmouth County highlighted in red (left). Inset map: Location of Monmouth County in New Jersey highlighted in orange (right).

- Location in Monmouth County Location in New Jersey Location in the United States
- Coordinates: 40.419287°N 74.060197°W
- Country: United States
- State: New Jersey
- County: Monmouth
- Township: Middletown
- Named for: Henry and James Leonard

Area
  - Total: 0.60 sq mi (1.56 km^{2})
  - Land: 0.59 sq mi (1.54 km^{2})
  - Water: 0.0077 sq mi (0.02 km^{2}) 1.38%
- Elevation: 16 ft (5 m)

Population (2020)
  - Total: 2,549
  - Density: 4,288/sq mi (1,655.6/km^{2})
- Time zone: UTC−05:00 (Eastern (EST))
  - Summer (DST): UTC−04:00 (Eastern (EDT))
- ZIP Code: 07737
- Area codes: 732/848
- FIPS code: 34-39990
- GNIS feature ID: 02390059

Leonardo is an unincorporated community and census-designated place (CDP) located on the north shore of Middletown Township, in Monmouth County, New Jersey, United States. The community is situated along the Raritan Bayshore and is part of the Jersey Shore region of the state. As of the 2020 United States census, the CDP's population was 2,549, a decrease of 208 (-7.5%) from the 2,757 enumerated at the 2010 census, which in turn had reflected a decline of 66 (-2.3%) from the 2,823 counted at the 2000 census. The ZIP Code for Leonardo is 07737.

== History ==
Leonardo is named for Henry and James Leonard, the first ironmasters of New Jersey.

During World War II, the large dock complex of Naval Weapons Station Earle was built to supply ammunition to the forces.

Leonardo is known as the site of the only casualties of the US Nike Missile program. On May 22, 1958, an Ajax missile exploded at the Nike missile base in Leonardo, killing six soldiers and four civilians. Since the Project Nike shutdown in 1974, the Leonardo launch base, designated NY-53, has been redeveloped into single-family home sites.

== Geography ==
Leonardo is located in northern Monmouth County, on the south shore of Raritan Bay. It is in northern Middletown Township and is bordered to the east by the borough of Atlantic Highlands and to the west by unincorporated Belford. New Jersey Route 36 forms the southern border of the Leonardo CDP; the highway runs east 4 miles (6 km) to Highlands and west 8 miles (13 km) to Keyport.

According to the U.S. Census Bureau, the Leonardo CDP has a total area of 0.600 square miles (1.554 km^{2}), including 0.006 square miles (0.016 km^{2}) of water (1.00%).

Climate data for Leonardo, NJ (2018-present)
Month	Jan	Feb	Mar	Apr	May	Jun	Jul	Aug	Sep	Oct	Nov	Dec	Year
Mean daily maximum °F (°C)	38 (3)	41 (5)	48 (9)	60 (16)	70 (21)	79 (26)	85 (29)	83 (28)	75 (24)	65 (18)	53 (12)	44 (7)	62 (17)
Mean daily minimum °F (°C)	25 (−4)	26 (−3)	32 (0)	40 (4)	50 (10)	59 (15)	67 (19)	65 (18)	57 (14)	48 (9)	37 (3)	29 (−2)	45 (7)
Average precipitation inches (mm)	3.2 (81)	2.4 (61)	3.5 (89)	3.2 (81)	3.6 (91)	3.5 (89)	3.9 (99)	3.9 (99)	3.6 (91)	3.0 (76)	2.7 (69)	3.5 (89)	40 (1,015)
Source: Leonardo Marina Station

== Demographics ==
Historical population
Census	Pop.	Note	%±
1950	1,887		—
1990	3,788		—
2000	2,823		−25.5%
2010	2,757		−2.3%
2020	2,549		−7.5%
Population sources: 1950 1960 1970; 1980 1990 2000; 2010 2020

Leonardo was listed as an unincorporated community in the 1950 U.S. census. The community was not listed in subsequent censuses until the 1990 U.S. census when it appeared as a census designated place.

=== Racial and ethnic composition ===
Leonardo CDP, New Jersey – Racial and ethnic composition Note: the US Census treats Hispanic/Latino as an ethnic category. This table excludes Latinos from the racial categories and assigns them to a separate category. Hispanics/Latinos may be of any race.
Race / Ethnicity (NH = Non-Hispanic)	Pop 2000	Pop 2010	Pop 2020	% 2000	% 2010	% 2020
White alone (NH)	2,632	2,486	2,204	93.23%	90.17%	86.47%
Black or African American alone (NH)	15	28	26	0.53%	1.02%	1.02%
Native American or Alaska Native alone (NH)	7	4	3	0.25%	0.15%	0.12%
Asian alone (NH)	14	28	16	0.50%	1.02%	0.63%
Native Hawaiian or Pacific Islander alone (NH)	0	0	1	0.00%	0.00%	0.04%
Other race alone (NH)	0	0	3	0.00%	0.00%	0.12%
Mixed race or Multiracial (NH)	18	32	61	0.64%	1.16%	2.39%
Hispanic or Latino (any race)	137	179	235	4.85%	6.49%	9.22%
Total	2,823	2,757	2,549	100.00%	100.00%	100.00%

=== 2020 census ===
As of the 2020 census, Leonardo had a population of 2,549. The median age was 43.7 years. 18.7% of residents were under the age of 18 and 16.5% of residents were 65 years of age or older. For every 100 females there were 95.5 males, and for every 100 females age 18 and over there were 94.7 males age 18 and over.

100.0% of residents lived in urban areas, while 0.0% lived in rural areas.

There were 1,000 households in Leonardo, of which 27.6% had children under the age of 18 living in them. Of all households, 53.8% were married-couple households, 17.5% were households with a male householder and no spouse or partner present, and 23.8% were households with a female householder and no spouse or partner present. About 25.8% of all households were made up of individuals and 9.6% had someone living alone who was 65 years of age or older.

There were 1,076 housing units, of which 7.1% were vacant. The homeowner vacancy rate was 2.1% and the rental vacancy rate was 6.3%.

=== 2010 census ===
The 2010 United States census counted 2,757 people, 1,001 households, and 742 families in the CDP. The population density was 4,636.1 people per square mile (1,790.0 people/km^{2}). There were 1,055 housing units at an average density of 1,774.1 units per square mile (685.0 units/km^{2}). The racial makeup was 95.47% (2,632) White, 1.02% (28) Black or African American, 0.15% (4) Native American, 1.02% (28) Asian, 0.00% (0) Pacific Islander, 0.91% (25) from other races, and 1.45% (40) from two or more races. Hispanic or Latino of any race were 6.49% (179) of the population.

Of the 1,001 households, 31.0% had children under the age of 18; 57.6% were married couples living together; 12.1% had a female householder with no husband present and 25.9% were non-families. Of all households, 20.0% were made up of individuals and 5.8% had someone living alone who was 65 years of age or older. The average household size was 2.75 and the average family size was 3.21.

22.8% of the population were under the age of 18, 8.7% from 18 to 24, 25.1% from 25 to 44, 33.0% from 45 to 64, and 10.4% who were 65 years of age or older. The median age was 40.2 years. For every 100 females, the population had 94.2 males. For every 100 females ages 18 and older there were 95.3 males.

=== 2000 census ===
As of the 2000 United States census there were 2,823 people, 987 households, and 753 families living in the CDP. The population density was 1,758.0 people/km^{2} (4,553 people/mi^{2}). There were 1,017 housing units at an average density of 633.3 units/km^{2} (1,640 units/mi^{2}). The racial makeup of the CDP was 95.85% White, 0.53% African American, 0.25% Native American, 0.50% Asian, 0.11% Pacific Islander, 0.46% from other races, and 0.89% from two or more races. Hispanic or Latino of any race were 4.85% of the population.

There were 987 households, out of which 35.9% had children under the age of 18 living with them, 61.5% were married couples living together, 10.4% had a female householder with no husband present, and 23.7% were non-families. 19.1% of all households were made up of individuals, and 4.9% had someone living alone who was 65 years of age or older. The average household size was 2.86 and the average family size was 3.31.

In the CDP, the population was spread out, with 25.9% under the age of 18, 7.7% from 18 to 24, 33.3% from 25 to 44, 24.7% from 45 to 64, and 8.4% who were 65 years of age or older. The median age was 37 years. For every 100 females, there were 100.4 males. For every 100 females age 18 and over, there were 98.8 males.

The median income for a household in the CDP was $64,432, and the median income for a family was $66,750. Males had a median income of $49,716 versus $30,400 for females. The per capita income for the CDP was $23,422. About 3.4% of families and 4.1% of the population were below the poverty line, including 5.7% of those under age 18 and 3.8% of those age 65 or over.

== Education ==
The area is served by the Middletown Township Public School District.

Leonardo is home to Bayshore Middle School and Leonardo Elementary School. Bayshore Middle School has a population of 623 students and is ranked the 267th middle school out of 745 in the State of New Jersey. Leonardo Elementary school has a population of 285 students. The school is ranked 790th out of 1,360 elementary schools in New Jersey.

== Transportation ==
New Jersey Transit offers local bus service on the 834 route.

== Notable people ==
People who were born in, residents of, or otherwise closely associated with Leonardo include:

- Donald De Lue (1897–1988), sculptor
- Billy Devaney (born 1955), former general manager of the St. Louis Rams
- Bill Kunkel (1936–1985), Major League Baseball pitcher and umpire
- Jeff Kunkel (born 1962) former major-league shortstop

Fictional characters associated with Leonardo:

- Jay and Silent Bob, characters portrayed by Jason Mewes and Kevin Smith, respectively, in Kevin Smith's View Askewniverse (a fictional universe created and used in most films, comics and television by Kevin Smith)
- Randal Graves, a character portrayed by Jeff Anderson, and Dante Hicks, Randal's friend and counterpart, played by Brian O'Halloran. Randal Graves and Dante Hicks, along with Jay and Silent Bob, are the main characters in the View Askewniverse, and have starred in all but three Kevin Smith films.

== In media ==
The community is best known as the site of the Quick Stop convenience store and RST Video store (located at 58 Leonard Avenue, just north of Route 36) that was the main location for the 1994 film Clerks, directed by Kevin Smith, who worked at the store at the time. The same store was also used by Smith in his films Chasing Amy (1997), Jay and Silent Bob Strike Back (2001), Clerks II (2006) and Jay and Silent Bob Reboot (2019), and was part of a deleted scene from his film Mallrats (1995). The location was also used in Kevin Smith's television show Clerks: The Animated Series (2000). The program's character Leonardo Leonardo (voiced by Alec Baldwin) was named after the town, and several of the characters resided and/or worked in Leonardo. The video store is now closed and only used for storage.
