= Belford, New Jersey =

Populated place in Monmouth County, New Jersey, US

- Census-designated place
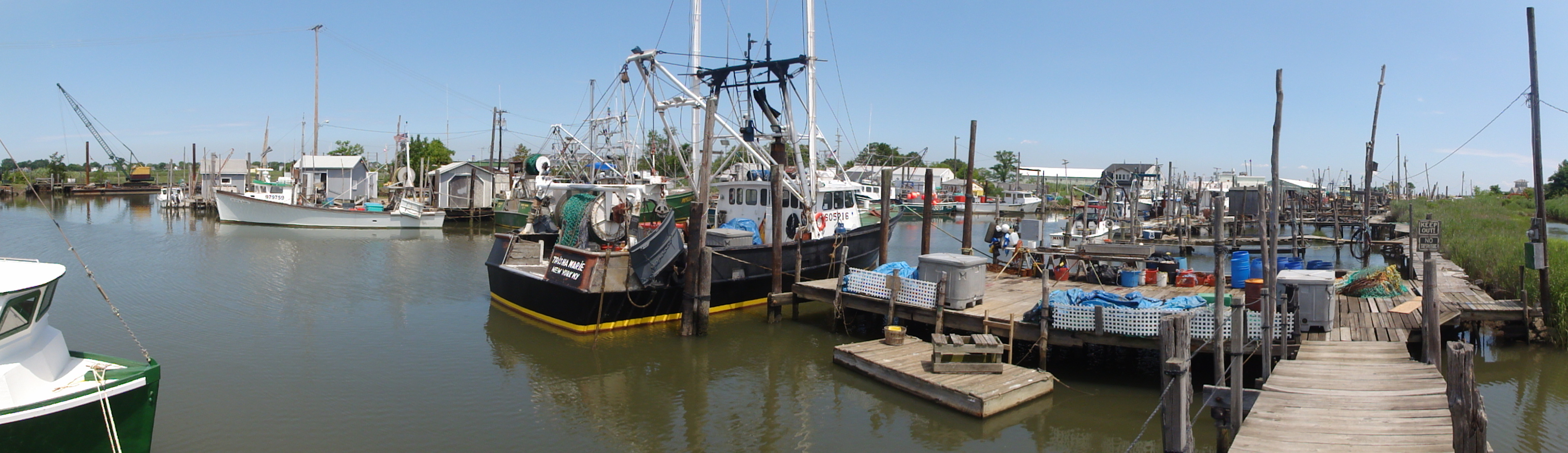
- Belford harbor

- Map of Belford CDP in Monmouth County. Inset: Location of Monmouth County in New Jersey.

- Location in Monmouth County Location in New Jersey Location in the United States
- Coordinates: 40.428075°N 74.078221°W
- Country: United States
- State: New Jersey
- County: Monmouth
- Township: Middletown

Area
  - Total: 1.29 sq mi (3.35 km^{2})
  - Land: 1.26 sq mi (3.26 km^{2})
  - Water: 0.035 sq mi (0.09 km^{2}) 2.60%
- Elevation: 9.8 ft (3 m)

Population (2020)
  - Total: 1,648
  - Density: 1,308.8/sq mi (505.33/km^{2})
- Time zone: UTC−05:00 (Eastern (EST))
  - Summer (DST): UTC−04:00 (Eastern (EDT))
- ZIP Code: 07718
- Area codes: 732/848
- FIPS code: 34-04600
- GNIS feature ID: 002389194

Belford is an unincorporated community and census-designated place (CDP) in Middletown Township, Monmouth County, New Jersey, United States. As of the 2020 census, the CDP's population was 1,648.

== Geography ==
Belford is in northern Monmouth County, along the northern edge of Middletown Township. It sits on the south shore of Sandy Hook Bay, a southern arm of Lower New York Bay. Belford is bordered to the west by Port Monmouth and to the east by Leonardo. Route 36 forms the southern border of the community, leading east 3 miles (5 km) to Atlantic Highlands and west the same distance to Keansburg.

According to the U.S. Census Bureau, the Belford CDP has a total area of 1.29 square miles (3.34 km^{2}), including 1.26 square miles (3.26 km^{2}) of land and 0.03 square miles (0.08 km^{2}) of water (2.63%). Campton Creek crosses the northwest corner of the community, entering Sandy Hook Bay at Belford Harbor. Ware Creek and an associated tidal marsh are in the eastern part of the community.

== Demographics ==
Historical population
Census	Pop.	Note	%±
1950	1,832		—
2000	1,340		—
2010	1,768		31.9%
2020	1,648		−6.8%
Population sources: 1950 1960 1970; 1980 1990 2000; 2010 2020

Belford was listed as an unincorporated community in the 1950 U.S. census. The community was not listed in subsequent censuses until the 2000 U.S. census when it appeared as a census designated place.

=== 2020 census ===
Belford CDP, New Jersey – Racial and ethnic composition Note: the US Census treats Hispanic/Latino as an ethnic category. This table excludes Latinos from the racial categories and assigns them to a separate category. Hispanics/Latinos may be of any race.
Race / Ethnicity (NH = Non-Hispanic)	Pop 2000	Pop 2010	Pop 2020	% 2000	% 2010	% 2020
White alone (NH)	1,255	1,536	1,343	93.66%	86.88%	81.49%
Black or African American alone (NH)	3	27	23	0.22%	1.53%	1.40%
Native American or Alaska Native alone (NH)	1	0	0	0.07%	0.00%	0.00%
Asian alone (NH)	8	36	47	0.60%	2.04%	2.85%
Native Hawaiian or Pacific Islander alone (NH)	0	0	0	0.00%	0.00%	0.00%
Other race alone (NH)	0	0	7	0.00%	0.00%	0.42%
Mixed race or Multiracial (NH)	10	26	54	0.75%	1.47%	3.28%
Hispanic or Latino (any race)	63	143	174	4.70%	8.09%	10.56%
Total	1,340	1,768	1,648	100.00%	100.00%	100.00%

=== 2010 census ===
The 2010 United States census counted 1,768 people, 584 households, and 459 families in the CDP. The population density was 1,382.2 per square mile (533.7/km^{2}). There were 616 housing units at an average density of 481.6 per square mile (185.9/km^{2}). The racial makeup was 94.17% (1,665) White, 1.53% (27) Black or African American, 0.00% (0) Native American, 2.04% (36) Asian, 0.00% (0) Pacific Islander, 0.57% (10) from other races, and 1.70% (30) from two or more races. Hispanic or Latino of any race were 8.09% (143) of the population.

Of the 584 households, 38.7% had children under the age of 18; 63.9% were married couples living together; 10.3% had a female householder with no husband present and 21.4% were non-families. Of all households, 15.8% were made up of individuals and 3.9% had someone living alone who was 65 years of age or older. The average household size was 2.93 and the average family size was 3.32.

26.1% of the population were under the age of 18, 7.9% from 18 to 24, 27.6% from 25 to 44, 30.9% from 45 to 64, and 7.4% who were 65 years of age or older. The median age was 38.6 years. For every 100 females, the population had 100.0 males. For every 100 females ages 18 and older there were 100.3 males.

=== 2000 census ===
As of the 2000 United States census there were 1,340 people, 436 households, and 374 families living in the CDP. The population density was 1,058.9 inhabitants per square mile (408.8/km^{2}). There were 458 housing units at an average density of 361.9 per square mile (139.7/km^{2}). The racial makeup of the CDP was 97.16% White, 0.22% African American, 0.07% Native American, 0.67% Asian, 1.12% from other races, and 0.75% from two or more races. Hispanic or Latino of any race were 4.70% of the population.

There were 436 households, out of which 42.0% had children under the age of 18 living with them, 69.5% were married couples living together, 11.7% had a female householder with no husband present, and 14.2% were non-families. 10.1% of all households were made up of individuals, and 3.7% had someone living alone who was 65 years of age or older. The average household size was 3.06 and the average family size was 3.29.

In the CDP the population was spread out, with 27.2% under the age of 18, 6.8% from 18 to 24, 34.4% from 25 to 44, 22.8% from 45 to 64, and 8.9% who were 65 years of age or older. The median age was 36 years. For every 100 females, there were 98.2 males. For every 100 females age 18 and over, there were 95.6 males.

The median income for a household in the CDP was $66,964, and the median income for a family was $70,583. Males had a median income of $51,830 versus $35,052 for females. The per capita income for the CDP was $25,412. About 1.3% of families and 3.2% of the population were below the poverty line, including 1.9% of those under age 18 and 6.1% of those age 65 or over.

== Transportation ==
The ferry slip at Belford is New York Waterway's Raritan Bayshore terminal with service to Pier 11 at Wall Street, Exchange Place, Jersey City, the Battery Park City Ferry Terminal, and West Midtown Ferry Terminal in New York City. Boats travel across Lower New York Bay and enter the harbor at The Narrows for a trip that takes approximately 50 minutes. In 2011, $2.5 million in state funding was awarded to improve the bulkhead at the facility. In 2023, New Jersey got $11.3 million from the federal government for hybrid-powered ferries for NY Waterway and upgrading the Belford Ferry Terminal. Out of the $11.3 million, $4 million was to be used to make repairs and updates to the Belford Ferry Terminal.

New Jersey Transit offers local bus service on the 817 and 834 routes.

== Notable people ==
People who were born in, residents of, or otherwise closely associated with Belford include:

- Knowshon Moreno, running back for the Denver Broncos and Miami Dolphins
- Tammy Lynn Sytch, professional wrestling manager best known for her time in the World Wrestling Federation as the character Sunny
- Claudia Vázquez (born 1990), footballer who has played as forward and midfielder for the Puerto Rico women's national football team
