= Navesink, New Jersey =

Populated place in Monmouth County, New Jersey, US

- Census-designated place
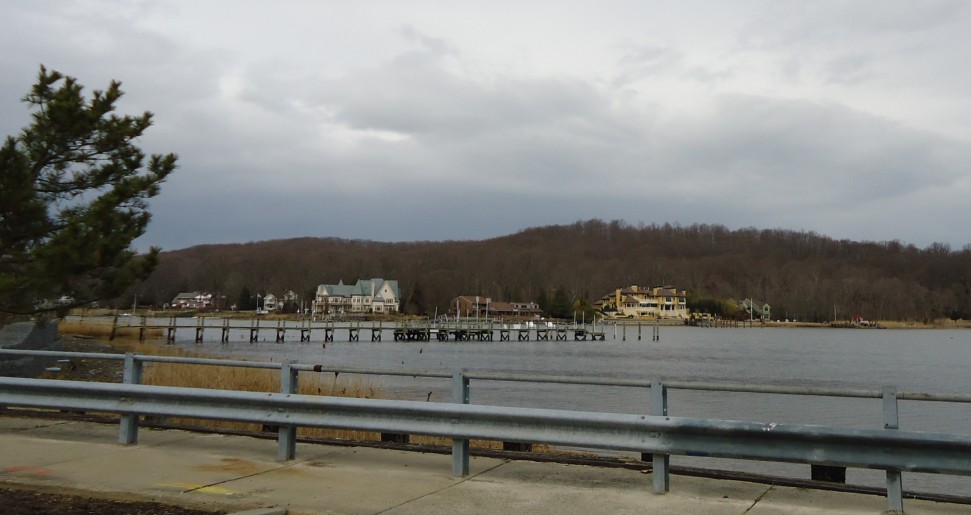
- Navesink as seen from the Oceanic Bridge across the Navesink River in Monmouth County

- Location of Navesink in Monmouth County highlighted in red (left). Inset map: Location of Monmouth County in New Jersey highlighted in orange (right).

- Location in Monmouth County Location in New Jersey Location in the United States
- Coordinates: 40.401105°N 74.040464°W
- Country: United States
- State: New Jersey
- County: Monmouth
- Township: Middletown

Area
  - Total: 0.90 sq mi (2.32 km^{2})
  - Land: 0.88 sq mi (2.29 km^{2})
  - Water: 0.012 sq mi (0.03 km^{2}) 1.27%
- Elevation: 118 ft (36 m)

Population (2020)
  - Total: 2,004
  - Density: 2,277.3/sq mi (879.3/km^{2})
- Time zone: UTC−05:00 (Eastern (EST))
  - Summer (DST): UTC−04:00 (Eastern (EDT))
- ZIP Code: 07752 (PO box); 07716 (Atlantic Highlands - street addresses)
- Area codes: 732/848
- FIPS code: 34-49740
- GNIS feature ID: 02389532

Navesink (/neɪvəsɪŋk/, NAY-və-sink) is an unincorporated community and census-designated place (CDP) located on the northernmost stretch of the Jersey Shore in Middletown Township in Monmouth County, in the U.S. state of New Jersey. As of the 2020 United States census, the CDP's population was 2,004, reflecting a decrease of 16 (-0.8%) from the 2,020 residents enumerated at the 2010 U.S. census.

== Geography ==
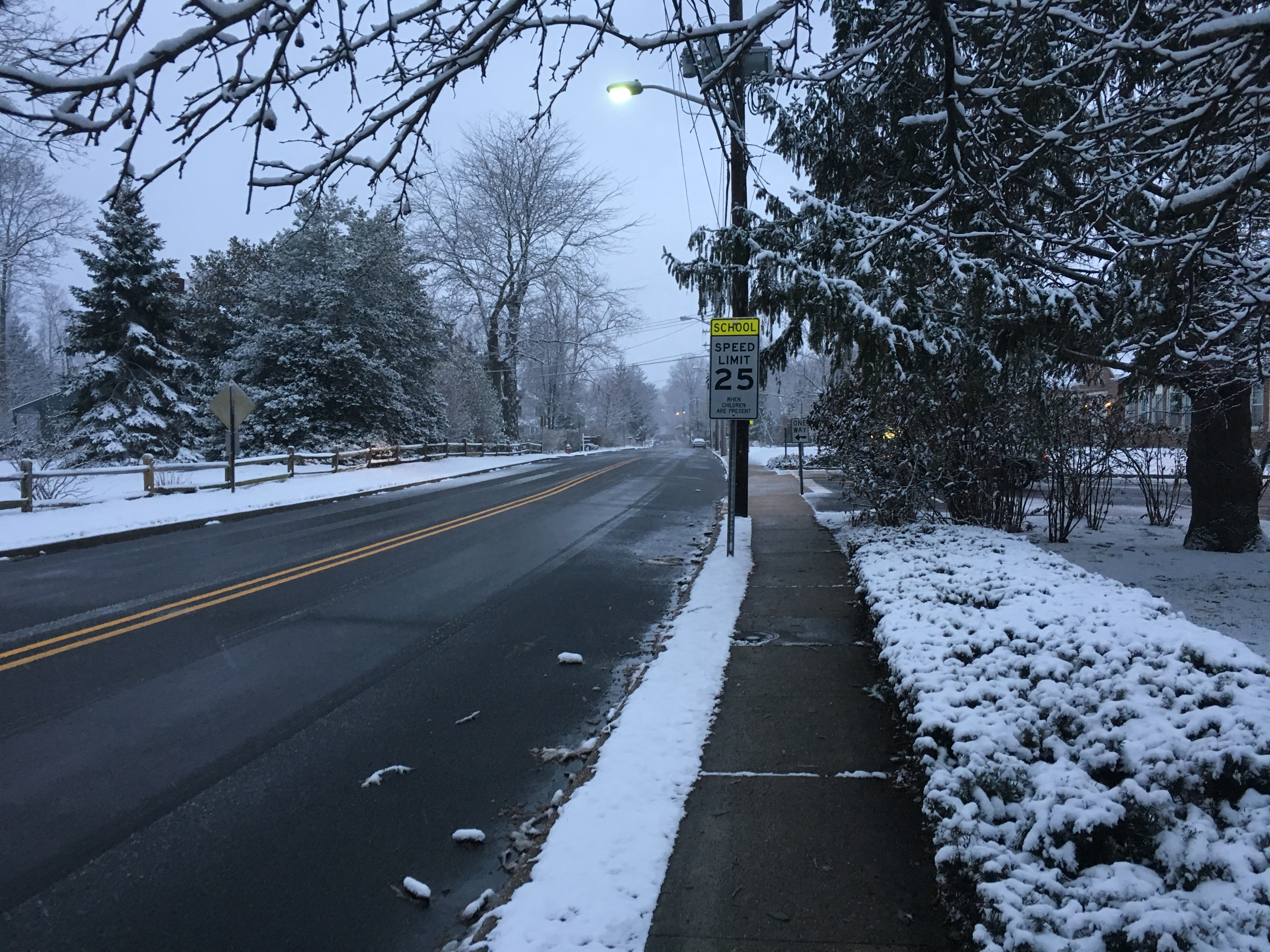
Navesink during the winter

Navesink is in northeastern Monmouth County, in the eastern part of Middletown Township. It is bordered to the north by the borough of Atlantic Highlands. New Jersey Route 36 runs close to the northern border of the community, leading east 2 miles (3 km) to the borough of Highlands and west 10 miles (16 km) to Keyport.

According to the U.S. Census Bureau, Navesink has a total area of 0.895 square miles (2.318 km^{2}), including 0.884 square miles (2.290 km^{2}) of land and 0.011 square miles (0.028 km^{2}) of water (1.23%). The community is drained to the south by Claypit Creek, a tributary of the tidal Navesink River. Many Mind Creek flows to the north out of Navesink toward Atlantic Highlands.

== Demographics ==
Historical population
Census	Pop.	Note	%±
1950	1,085		—
2000	1,962		—
2010	2,020		3.0%
2020	2,004		−0.8%
Population sources: 1950 1960 1970; 1980 1990 2000; 2010 2020

Navesink appeared as an unincorporated community in the 1950 U.S. census. It did not appear in subsequent censuses until it was listed as a census designated place in the 2000 U.S. census.

=== Racial and ethnic composition ===
Navesink CDP, New Jersey – Racial and ethnic composition Note: the US Census treats Hispanic/Latino as an ethnic category. This table excludes Latinos from the racial categories and assigns them to a separate category. Hispanics/Latinos may be of any race.
Race / Ethnicity (NH = Non-Hispanic)	Pop 2000	Pop 2010	Pop 2020	% 2000	% 2010	% 2020
White alone (NH)	1,623	1,736	1,694	82.72%	85.94%	84.53%
Black or African American alone (NH)	235	118	78	11.98%	5.84%	3.89%
Native American or Alaska Native alone (NH)	1	0	0	0.05%	0.00%	0.00%
Asian alone (NH)	27	45	40	1.38%	2.23%	2.00%
Native Hawaiian or Pacific Islander alone (NH)	1	0	0	0.05%	0.00%	0.00%
Other race alone (NH)	2	2	12	0.10%	0.10%	0.60%
Mixed race or Multiracial (NH)	23	19	75	1.17%	0.94%	3.74%
Hispanic or Latino (any race)	50	100	105	2.55%	4.95%	5.24%
Total	1,962	2,020	2,004	100.00%	100.00%	100.00%

=== 2020 census ===
As of the 2020 census, Navesink had a population of 2,004. The median age was 42.6 years. 23.7% of residents were under the age of 18 and 17.2% were 65 years of age or older. For every 100 females, there were 95.3 males, and for every 100 females age 18 and over, there were 94.9 males age 18 and over.

100.0% of residents lived in urban areas, while 0.0% lived in rural areas.

There were 712 households, of which 35.1% had children under the age of 18 living in them. Of all households, 64.0% were married-couple households, 12.9% were households with a male householder and no spouse or partner present, and 18.5% were households with a female householder and no spouse or partner present. About 19.2% of all households were made up of individuals, and 9.9% had someone living alone who was 65 years of age or older.

There were 765 housing units, of which 6.9% were vacant. The homeowner vacancy rate was 0.6% and the rental vacancy rate was 13.5%.

=== 2010 census ===
The 2010 United States census counted 2,020 people, 691 households, and 549 families in the CDP. The population density was 2,283.6 per square mile (881.7/km^{2}). There were 732 housing units at an average density of 827.5 per square mile (319.5/km^{2}). The racial makeup was 89.55% (1,809) White, 6.09% (123) Black or African American, 0.10% (2) Native American, 2.23% (45) Asian, 0.00% (0) Pacific Islander, 0.74% (15) from other races, and 1.29% (26) from two or more races. Hispanic or Latino of any race were 4.95% (100) of the population.

Of the 691 households, 38.5% had children under the age of 18; 63.5% were married couples living together; 11.6% had a female householder with no husband present and 20.5% were non-families. Of all households, 16.6% were made up of individuals and 4.6% had someone living alone who was 65 years of age or older. The average household size was 2.92 and the average family size was 3.30.

27.1% of the population were under the age of 18, 6.6% from 18 to 24, 23.1% from 25 to 44, 33.7% from 45 to 64, and 9.4% who were 65 years of age or older. The median age was 40.7 years. For every 100 females, the population had 90.6 males. For every 100 females ages 18 and older there were 90.2 males.

=== 2000 census ===
As of the 2000 United States census, there were 1,962 people, 623 households, and 497 families living in the CDP. The population density was 2,178.8 inhabitants per square mile (841.2/km^{2}). There were 647 housing units at an average density of 718.5 per square mile (277.4/km^{2}). The racial makeup of the CDP was 84.20% White, 12.03% African American, 0.25% Native American, 1.38% Asian, 0.05% Pacific Islander, 0.56% from other races, and 1.53% from two or more races. Hispanic or Latino of any race were 2.55% of the population.

There were 623 households, out of which 39.5% had children under the age of 18 living with them, 64.4% were married couples living together, 12.0% had a female householder with no husband present, and 20.1% were non-families. 14.8% of all households were made up of individuals, and 5.1% had someone living alone who was 65 years of age or older. The average household size was 2.93 and the average family size was 3.26.

The population was spread out, with 26.2% under the age of 18, 4.9% from 18 to 24, 29.2% from 25 to 44, 25.2% from 45 to 64, and 14.5% who were 65 years of age or older. The median age was 40 years. For every 100 females, there were 94.4 males. For every 100 females age 18 and over, there were 87.6 males.

The median income for a household in the CDP was $81,456, and the median income for a family was $86,865. Males had a median income of $56,786 versus $40,833 for females. The per capita income for the CDP was $27,673. None of the families and 1.6% of the population were living below the poverty line, including no under eighteens and 8.5% of those over 64.

== Historic district ==
- Navesink Historic District
- U.S. National Register of Historic Places
- U.S. Historic district
- New Jersey Register of Historic Places
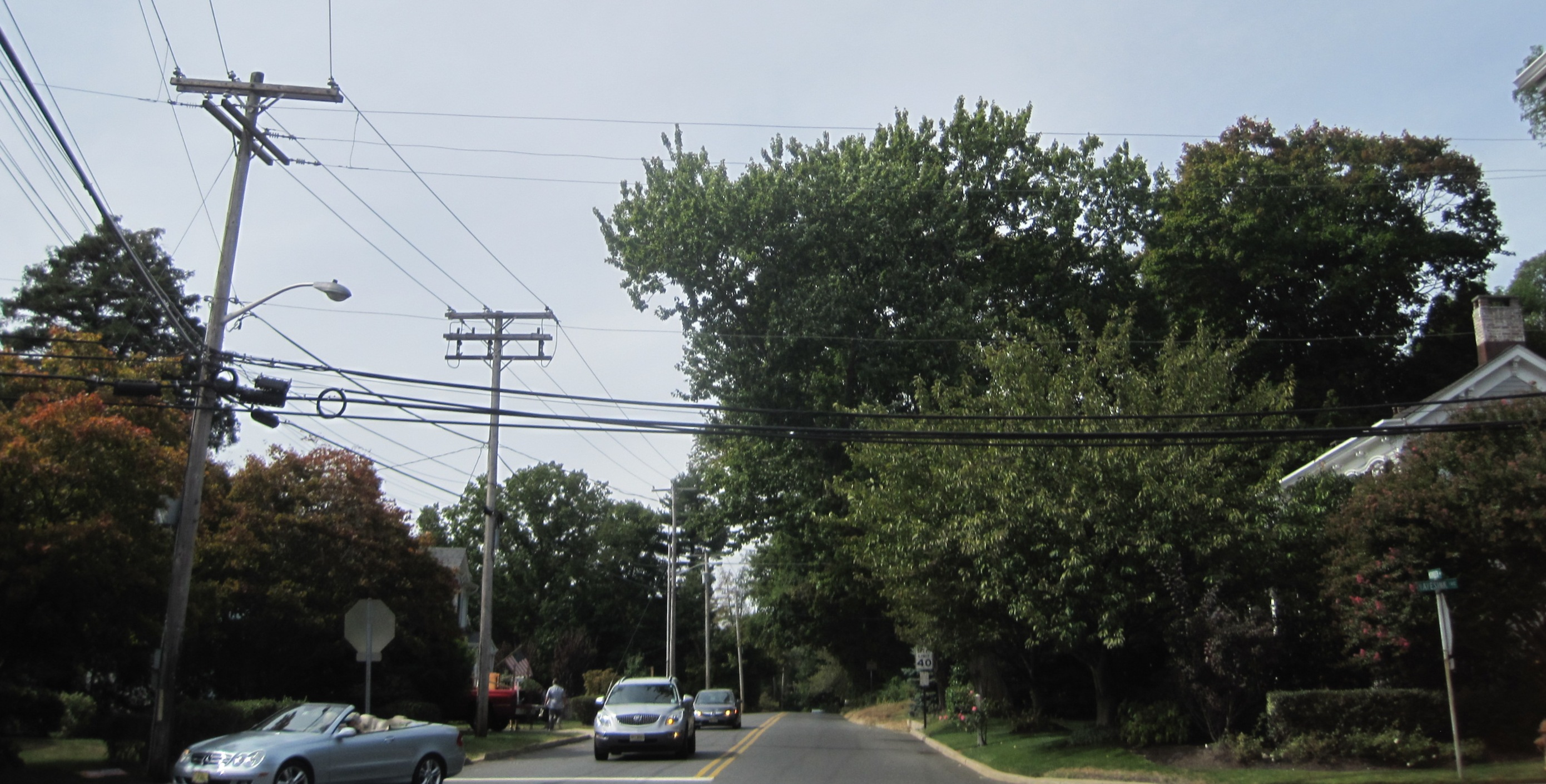
- Location: Roughly triangular area including both sides of Monmouth and Locust Avenues to the junction with Hillside and Grand Avenues
- Area: 35 acres (14 ha)
- Architectural style: Greek Revival, Late Victorian
- NRHP reference No.: 75001148
- NJRHP No.: 2027

Significant dates
- Added to NRHP: September 5, 1975
- Designated NJRHP: October 21, 1974

The Navesink Historic District is a historic district located along both sides of Monmouth and Locust avenues to the junction with Hillside and Grand avenues. The district was added to the National Register of Historic Places on September 5, 1975, for its significance in commerce. The district contains 96 contributing properties, including churches, a school, houses and association outbuildings, a library, and commercial establishments.

== Transportation ==
New Jersey Transit offers local bus service on the 834 route. Major roads in Navesink include NJ Route 36 and County Route 516, both of which clip the northern end of Navesink's limits.

== Notable people ==
People who were born in, residents of, or otherwise closely associated with Navesink include:

- Tom Hanson (1907-1970), halfback in the National Football League, mainly for the Philadelphia Eagles, for whom he caught the first touchdown in franchise history
- Richard Scudder (1913-2012), newspaper pioneer and co-founder of the MediaNews Group
- William Strickland (1788–1854), pioneering architect and civil engineer
