= Rick Lovato =

American football player (born 1992)

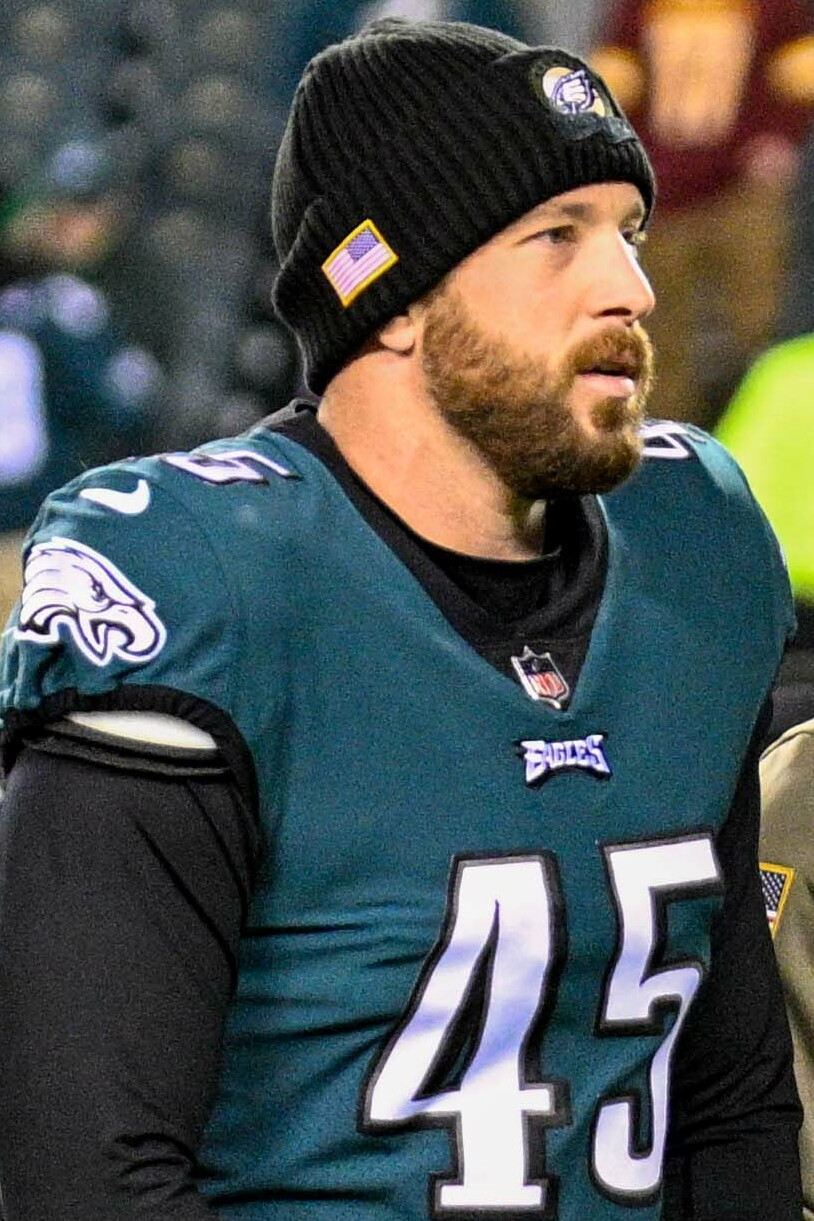
- Lovato with the Philadelphia Eagles in 2022

No. 59, 45, 49, 41
- Position: Long snapper

Personal information
- Born: September 9, 1992 (age 34); Neptune Township, New Jersey, U.S.
- Listed height: 6 ft 2 in (1.88 m)
- Listed weight: 249 lb (113 kg)

Career information
- High school: Middletown South (Middletown, New Jersey)
- College: Old Dominion (2011–2014)
- NFL draft: 2015: undrafted

Career history
- Chicago Bears (2015)*; Green Bay Packers (2015); Washington Redskins (2016); Philadelphia Eagles (2016–2024); Los Angeles Chargers (2025)
- * Offseason or practice squad member only

Awards and highlights
- 2× Super Bowl champion (LII, LIX); Pro Bowl (2019); FCS All-American (2012)

Career NFL statistics
- Games played: 148
- Total tackles: 23
- Forced fumbles: 1
- Stats at Pro Football Reference

Richard Peter Lovato Jr. (born September 9, 1992) is an American former professional football player who was a long snapper in the National Football League (NFL). He played college football for the Old Dominion Monarchs. Lovato was signed by the Chicago Bears as an undrafted free agent in 2015. Lovato was the long snapper for the Philadelphia Eagles from 2017 to 2024 and won Super Bowl LII and Super Bowl LIX with them. He also played for the Green Bay Packers, Washington Redskins, and Los Angeles Chargers.

== Early life ==
Lovato was born in Neptune Township, New Jersey, the son of Rick and Maureen Lovato. He attended Middletown High School South in Middletown, New Jersey, where he started long snapping as a freshman. He also saw time at center and on the defensive line.

== College career ==
Lovato played college football for the Old Dominion Monarchs football team from 2011 to 2014. He appeared in all 50 games as the Monarchs’ long snapper.

Lovato was the first player from Old Dominion to play in the National Football League.

== Professional career ==
Pre-draft measurables
| Height | Weight | Arm length | Hand span | 40-yard dash | 10-yard split | 20-yard split | 20-yard shuttle | Three-cone drill | Vertical jump | Broad jump | Bench press |
|---|---|---|---|---|---|---|---|---|---|---|---|
| 6 ft 2 1/8 in (1.88 m) | 235 lb (107 kg) | 30 in (0.76 m) | 9 in (0.23 m) | 5.18 s | 1.75 s | 2.88 s | 4.63 s | 7.78 s | 25.5 in (0.65 m) | 8 ft 6 in (2.59 m) | 20 reps |
All values are from Pro Day

=== Chicago Bears ===
After going undrafted in the 2015 NFL draft, Lovato signed with the Chicago Bears on May 3, 2015. On August 30, 2015, he was released by the Bears.

=== Green Bay Packers ===
On December 22, 2015, Lovato was signed by the Green Bay Packers after starting long snapper Brett Goode suffered a season-ending knee injury. Prior to being signed, he was working at a sandwich shop in Lincroft, New Jersey owned by his father and uncle. Lovato became the first Old Dominion alumnus to play in a regular-season NFL game after handling snapping duties for every punt and field goal against the Arizona Cardinals in Week 16. On September 3, 2016, he was released by the Packers during final team cuts.

=== Washington Redskins ===
On November 19, 2016, Lovato was signed by the Washington Redskins to fill in for the injured Nick Sundberg. He was released on November 29, 2016.

=== Philadelphia Eagles ===
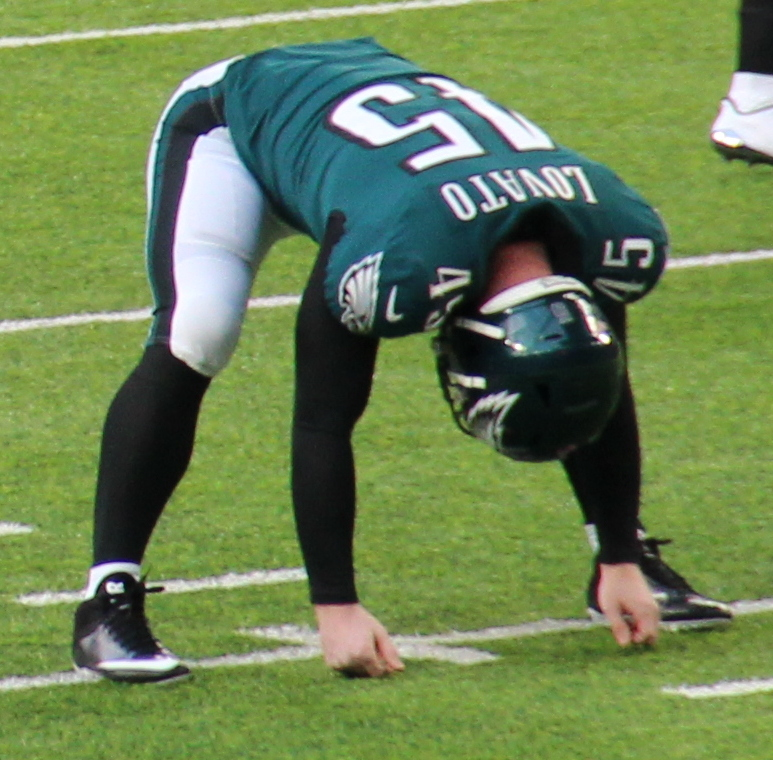
Lovato warming up prior to Super Bowl LII

On December 12, 2016, Lovato was signed by the Philadelphia Eagles after starting long snapper Jon Dorenbos suffered a broken wrist.

Lovato earned the Eagles long snapping job in 2017 after the team traded away Dorenbos. Lovato would go on to win Super Bowl LII with the Eagles.

On November 19, 2019, Lovato signed a four-year contract extension with the Eagles through the 2023 season. He was selected to the Pro Bowl on December 17, 2019.

On October 25, 2021, Lovato was waived by the Eagles following the waiver claim of Reid Sinnett. Lovato re-signed to the Eagles' 53-man roster the following day.

In 2022, Lovato reached his second career Super Bowl. The Eagles lost 38–35 to the Kansas City Chiefs in Super Bowl LVII.

On March 12, 2024, Lovato signed a one-year contract extension with the Eagles. In his 2024 season, Lovato would go on to win Super Bowl LIX with the Eagles, joining defensive end Brandon Graham, offensive tackle Lane Johnson, and kicker Jake Elliott as the only four players to win Super Bowls LII and LIX with the franchise.

=== Los Angeles Chargers ===
On August 26, 2025, Lovato was signed to the Los Angeles Chargers' practice squad. On September 15, he was signed to the active roster. Lovato was released on October 17 and was subsequently re-signed to the team's practice squad. On October 21, Lovato was signed to the active roster. Lovato retired from professional football on November 4, in part due to the impending return of Josh Harris.

== Personal life ==
A native of Monmouth County, New Jersey, Lovato is a fan of the New Jersey Devils of the National Hockey League.
