= Middletown Township Public School District =

School district in Monmouth County, New Jersey, US

Address
- 834 Leonardville Road Middletown Township, Monmouth County, New Jersey, 07748; United States
- Coordinates: 40.412970°N 74.059242°W

District information
- Grades: PreK-12
- Superintendent: Kevin Cullen (interim)
- Business administrator: Amy P. Doherty
- Schools: 16

Students and staff
- Enrollment: 8,895 (as of 2023–24)
- Faculty: 769.5 FTEs
- Student–teacher ratio: 11.6:1

Other information
- District Factor Group: GH
- Website: www.middletownk12.org
Ind.	Per pupil	District spending	Rank (*)	K-12 average	%± vs. average
1A	Total Spending	$17,159	29	$18,891	−9.2%
1	Budgetary Cost	13,115	27	14,783	−11.3%
2	Classroom Instruction	8,611	51	8,763	−1.7%
6	Support Services	1,614	10	2,392	−32.5%
8	Administrative Cost	1,216	17	1,485	−18.1%
10	Operations & Maintenance	1,438	28	1,783	−19.3%
13	Extracurricular Activities	231	47	268	−13.8%
16	Median Teacher Salary	72,130	85	64,043
Data from NJDoE 2014 Taxpayers' Guide to Education Spending. *Of K-12 districts with more than 3,500 students. Lowest spending=1; Highest=103

The Middletown Township Public School District is a comprehensive community public school district that serves students from pre-kindergarten through twelfth grade from Middletown Township in Monmouth County, in the U.S. state of New Jersey.

As of the 2023–24 school year, the district, comprised of 16 schools, had an enrollment of 8,895 students and 769.5 classroom teachers (on an FTE basis), for a student–teacher ratio of 11.6:1.

== History ==
In 1948, the schools were racially integrated and all of the teachers were white.

The Middletown Township Education Association (MTEA) is the Middletown Township teachers' union. The organization is Middletown's local NEA, NJEA MCEA office.

The district received national attention in the fall of 2001 when its teachers and secretaries went on strike for the second time in three years. The strike disrupted classes from November 30 to December 7, 2001. 228 teachers and secretaries were jailed in alphabetical order for violating a court back-to-work order. After the strike, members of the MTEA successfully lobbied to change the state law to prohibit school boards from imposing a contract on their employees (signed into law July 10, 2003).

The union, with over 1,200 members, had elected Diane Swaim president in 1983, and re-elected her in May 2007. Swaim retired on January 1, 2008, and was replaced by the first vice president, Linda McLaughlin There has not been a strike since 2001. The union and board of education amicably settled the next contract (July 1, 2004 – June 30, 2007) in April 2004, months before the expiration of the old contract. The union and board reached a new contract settlement without acrimony for 2007–2010.

In October 2006, the board of education voted to implement a random drug testing procedure that would require all students in extracurricular activities or with a parking space at either high school to submit their name to a pool for random selection.

On May 31, 2022, following the mass shooting in Robb Elementary School in Uvalde, Texas, the school board unanimously voted to have a police officer in each school at the hourly rate of $50 until the end of the 2021–2022 school year. For the 2022–2023 school year, a Class III special law enforcement officer would be at every school in the district, at an hourly rate not to exceed $35.

The district had been classified by the New Jersey Department of Education as being in District Factor Group "GH", the third-highest of eight groupings. District Factor Groups organize districts statewide to allow comparison by common socioeconomic characteristics of the local districts. From lowest socioeconomic status to highest, the categories are A, B, CD, DE, FG, GH, I and J.

== Schools ==
The district consists of twelve K–5 elementary schools, three middle schools for grades 6–8, and two four-year high schools. Four elementary schools feed into each of the three middle schools. The facilities vary in age, architecture, size, and student population. Schools in the district (with 2023-24 enrollment data from the National Center for Education Statistics) are:

Elementary schools

- Bayview Elementary School (with 367 students in grades K–5)
  - Tara Raspanti, principal
- Fairview Elementary School (296; PreK–5)
  - Michael Melando, principal
- Harmony Elementary School (486; PreK–5)
  - Erik Paulson, principal
- Leonardo Elementary School (284; K–5)
  - Peter Smith, principal
- Lincroft Elementary School (491; K–5)
  - Brian Dorgan, principal
- Middletown Village Elementary School (439; K–5)
  - David Whitman, principal
- Navesink Elementary School (209; K–5)
  - Jesse Herbert, principal
- New Monmouth Elementary School (510; PreK–5)
  - Christopher Reginio, principal
- Nut Swamp Elementary School (465; K–5)
  - Carey Albanese, principal
- Ocean Avenue Elementary School (289; K–5)
  - Neil Leone, principal
- River Plaza Elementary School (267; K–5)
  - Amanda Mergner, principal

Middle schools

- Bayshore Middle School (534; 6–8)
  - Todd Curtis, principal
- Thompson Middle School (859; 6–8)
  - Brian Currie, principal
- Thorne Middle School (596; 6–8)
  - Shannon Smith, principal

High schools

- Middletown High School North (1,284; 9–12)
  - Matthew Ferri, principal
- Middletown High School South (1,394; 9–12)
  - Thomas J. Olausen, principal

== Administration ==
Core district administrators are:

- Kevin Cullen, interim superintendent
- Amy P. Doherty, business administrator and board secretary

The district's last permanent superintendent, Jessica Alfone, retired in June 2026. Assistant Superintendent Kevin Cullen is serving as interim/acting superintendent until July 2027 when the new permanent superintendent is expected to start.

== Board of education ==
The district's board of education, composed of nine members, sets policy and oversees the fiscal and educational operation of the district through its administration. As a Type II school district, the board's trustees are elected directly by voters to serve three-year terms of office on a staggered basis, with three seats up for election each year held (since 2012) as part of the November general election. The board appoints a superintendent to oversee the district's day-to-day operations and a business administrator to supervise the business functions of the district.
