= Bill Kunkel (baseball) =

American baseball player and umpire (1936-1985)

- Kunkel with the 1963 New York Yankees
- Pitcher / Umpire
- Born: July 7, 1936; Hoboken, New Jersey, U.S.
- Died: May 4, 1985 (aged 48); Red Bank, New Jersey, U.S.
- Batted: Right Threw: Right

MLB debut
- April 15, 1961, for the Kansas City Athletics

Last MLB appearance
- September 21, 1963, for the New York Yankees

MLB statistics
- Win–loss record: 6–6
- Earned run average: 4.29
- Strikeouts: 83
- Stats at Baseball Reference

Teams
- Kansas City Athletics (1961–1962); New York Yankees (1963)

William Gustave James Kunkel (July 7, 1936 – May 4, 1985) was an American relief pitcher in Major League Baseball (MLB) from 1961 to 1963, who went on to a career as an American League umpire from 1968 through 1984. As a player, he was listed at 6 feet 1 inch (1.85 m) and 187 pounds (85 kg); he both threw and batted right-handed. As of 2026, he is the most recent former MLB player to have umpired an MLB game. His son Jeff was a major league shortstop from 1984 to 1992.

== Playing career ==
Kunkel was born in Hoboken, New Jersey, in 1936, and graduated from Demarest High School (now Hoboken High School. He was originally signed by the Boston Red Sox in 1955, and played that season for a lower-level farm team, the Bluefield Blue–Grays, posting a 9.90 ERA in two appearances. In 1956, he played for a Brooklyn Dodgers farm team, the Shawnee Hawks, where he had a 4.50 ERA in 40 games, including 15 starts. Kunkel did not play professionally during the 1957 and 1958 seasons, due to military service. He then pitched two seasons in the Los Angeles Dodgers' system; 1959 with the Great Falls Electrics and 1960 with the Triple-A Montreal Royals, registering 4.19 and 3.86 ERAs, respectively.

=== Kansas City Athletics ===
In November 1960, Kunkel was selected by the Kansas City Athletics in the Rule 5 draft, and spent the 1961 season with the A's. He made his MLB debut on April 15, pitching three innings in relief against the New York Yankees, allowing three hits and one run. With the 1961 A's, Kunkel pitched in 58 games (two starts) with a 5.18 ERA and 3–4 record in 88 2/3 innings pitched. In 1962, Kunkel split time between the A's and the Triple-A Portland Beavers, appearing in nine MLB games (3.52 ERA in 7 2/3 innings) and 10 Triple-A games (5.12 ERA in 51 innings). On August 3, Kunkel and Leo Posada were traded to the Milwaukee Braves for Orlando Peña.

Kunkel finished the 1962 season with Milwaukee's Triple-A affiliate, the Toronto Maple Leafs of the International League, pitching to a 6–1 record with 2.35 ERA in 15 games (two starts) and 46 innings of work.

=== New York Yankees ===
Kunkel was again a Rule 5 draft pick, this time by the New York Yankees on November 26, 1962. With the 1963 Yankees, he made 22 relief appearances with a 3–2 record and 2.72 ERA in 46 1/3 innings pitched. Kunkel was on the Yankees' roster for the 1963 World Series, but he did not make an appearance, as the Yankees were swept by the Dodgers.

Kunkel returned to the Braves' system for the 1964 season, spending time with two Triple-A clubs, the Denver Bears of the Pacific Coast League (3.68 ERA in 66 innings) and the Maple Leafs (3.11 ERA in 55 innings).

At the end of spring training in 1965, Kunkel was released by the Atlanta Crackers, the Braves' affiliate in the International League that season. He signed the following week with the Rochester Red Wings, Triple-A affiliate of the Baltimore Orioles, and in August with the Syracuse Chiefs, Triple-A affiliate of the Detroit Tigers. While Kunkel pitched for both Rochester and Syracuse during 1965, records for those stints are incomplete. Syracuse released Kunkel at the end of August.

Overall, Kunkel appeared in MLB during three seasons, compiling a 6–6 record, 4.29 ERA, 83 strikeouts, and 49 walks in 142 2/3 innings pitched. As a batter, he hit 3-for-14 (.214) with an RBI and two runs scored.

== Officiating career ==
Kunkel worked as a referee in the National Basketball Association for two seasons, 1966–67 and 1967–68, and in the American Basketball Association during the 1968–69 season.

Kunkel was an umpire in the Florida State League in 1966, and in the Southern League during 1967 and 1968. He made his American League umpiring debut in 1968, working nine games in September. He became a full-time umpire in 1969, working 163 games, and umpired more than 150 games each season through 1978. From 1979 through 1984, the number of games he worked each season varied between 40 and 144. He umpired his final MLB game on August 28, 1984. In his 17 seasons as an AL umpire, he officiated 2227 regular season games.

Kunkel officiated in the World Series in 1974 and 1980, and in the American League Championship Series in 1971, 1975, 1978 and 1982. He also worked the All-Star Game in 1972 and 1977, calling balls and strikes for the second contest. Kunkel's experience as the plate umpire is documented in the MLB official highlight film of the 1977 All-Star Game.

=== Notable games ===
On August 10, 1971, Kunkel was the home plate umpire when Harmon Killebrew hit his 500th career home run. As a pitcher, Kunkel had given up three home runs to Killebrew during the 1961 season.

On September 28, 1974, Kunkel was the first base umpire when Nolan Ryan pitched the third of his record seven no-hitters. On September 28, 1975, exactly one year later, Kunkel was behind the plate when four Oakland Athletics pitchers—Vida Blue, Glenn Abbott, Paul Lindblad and Rollie Fingers—combined to no-hit the California Angels, 5–0.

On September 30, 1980, Kunkel caught pitcher Rick Honeycutt of the Seattle Mariners using a thumb tack to illegally alter baseballs during a game against the Kansas City Royals. Kunkel ejected both Honeycutt and Seattle manager Maury Wills.

On April 25, 1981, Kunkel was the crew chief when Seattle manager Maury Wills had the batter's boxes drawn at a larger-than-regulation size prior to a game at the Kingdome, which was detected by opposing manager Billy Martin of the Oakland Athletics. Kunkel ordered the boxes redrawn by the grounds crew, and Wills was later fined and suspended.

== Death ==
Kunkel died on May 4, 1985, of cancer at age 48 in Red Bank, New Jersey. During his battle with cancer, Kunkel was featured in Safe at Home, a 10-minute film released by the American Cancer Society. Regarding his recovery, Kunkel stated that "I'm living proof that there's life after cancer. ... My problem never enters my mind until someone brings it up."

=== Legacy ===
Kunkel's uniform number 9, assigned when the American League adopted umpire numbers in 1980, was retired after his death until the umpiring staffs were unified in 2000, when it was assigned to Brian Gorman.

At the time of his death, Kunkel was one of only two umpires still using the outside chest protector, Jerry Neudecker being the other.

Kunkel was the last MLB player who later became a major league umpire.

In addition to his son Jeff Kunkel playing in MLB; son Kevin Kunkel, both had minor league playing careers. Father-and-son Bill and Jeff were featured on a Topps baseball card in 1985, # 136.

There is a park named in Kunkel's honor in the Leonardo section of Middletown Township, New Jersey, where he had been a longtime resident.

== See also ==
- List of Major League Baseball umpires (disambiguation)
