= List of consumer organizations =

This is a list of consumer organizations.

== International ==
- ANEC
- Consumers International
- International Consumer Research & Testing

== Botswana ==
- Consumer Watchdog (Botswana)

== Chile ==
- Chile - Asociación de Consumidores y Usuarios "Orcus"

== Germany ==
- Federal Office of Consumer Protection and Food Safety
- Stiftung Warentest

== Hong Kong ==
- Consumer Council (Hong Kong) - also publisher of the Choice magazine

== Myanmar ==
- Consumer Protection Association

== New Zealand ==
- Consumer NZ - publisher of New Zealand's Consumer magazine.

== Pakistan ==
- Competition Commission of Pakistan
- The Consumers Eye Pakistan (TCEP)

(QSA) - Organizer of Quality Standard Award Pakistan .

- Consumer Voice Pakistan (CVP)

(CVM) - publisher of Consumer Voice magazine.

== Portugal ==
- Associação Portuguesa para a Defesa do Consumidor (DECO) - publisher of PRO TESTE magazine.
- Autoridade da Concorrência
- Citizen's Voice - Consumer Advocacy Association
- Ius Omnibus

== Uganda ==
- Uganda Consumer Action Network (U-CAN)

== United Kingdom ==
- Campaign for Real Ale (CAMRA)
- Consumers' Association - publisher of Which?
- Energywatch
- Financial Services Authority
- Transport Focus

== United States ==
- AARP
- Alliance for Affordable Services
- Alliance for Justice
- American Automobile Association
- American Coalition of Citizens with Disabilities
- Association of Community Organizations for Reform Now (ACORN)
- Better Business Bureau
- Consumer Action
- Consumers' Checkbook
- Consumer Federation of America
- Consumer Reports
- Consumers Union
- Consumer Watchdog
- FlyersRights.org
- Funeral Consumers Alliance
- National Consumer Law Center (NCLC)
- National Consumers League
- National Council Against Health Fraud
- Organic Consumers Association
- Public Citizen
- Public Interest Research Group (PIRG)
- Quackwatch
- TURN (The Utility Reform Network)
- Underwriters Laboratories
