= Consumer watchdog =

A consumer watchdog may refer to:

- Consumer organization
- Consumer Watchdog, an organization that advocates for taxpayer and consumer interests in the United States
- Consumer Watchdog (Botswana), a private consumer rights advocacy group in Botswana
- Watchdog journalism

== See also ==
- Watchdog (disambiguation)
- List of consumer organizations
