= European Consumer Organisation =

- Formation: 1962
- Type: Non-governmental organisation
- Purpose: Consumer protection
- Location: Belgium, Brussels
- Members: 42
- President: Arnold Koopmans
- Director General: Agustín Reyna
- Main organ: Executive Board
- Website: www.beuc.eu

The European Consumer Organisation (BEUC /bɜːk/, from the French name Bureau Européen des Unions de Consommateurs, "European Bureau of Consumers' Unions") is an umbrella consumers' group, founded in 1962. Based in Brussels, Belgium, it brings together 42 European consumer organisations from 31 countries (EU, EEA and applicant countries).

BEUC represents its members and defends the interests of consumers in the decision process of the Institutions of the European Union, acting as the "consumer voice in Europe". BEUC does not deal with consumers’ complaints as it is the role of its national member organisations.

BEUC has subscribed to the European Union’s Transparency Register under the following registration number: 9505781573-45.

== History ==
BEUC was created on 6 March 1962 by consumer organisations of Belgium, Luxembourg, France, the Netherlands, Italy and Germany. After working together for a number of years, these organisations decided to create a European association, based in Brussels.

BEUC was one of the first organisations to set up base in the European capital in a bid to represent consumers’ interests in the decision-making process. Many others followed, and the number of advocates rose exponentially to the present-day figure of over 15,000.

BEUC has its own archives stored and catalogued in the Historical Archives of the European Union (HAEU). The archives are hosted by the European University Institute in Florence, Italy, and represent over 30 linear metres and 931 files summing up BEUC history between 1962 and 2018.

== Activities ==
The organisation's work involves making sure the EU takes policy decisions that improve the lives of consumers. This covers a range of topics including competition, consumer rights, digital rights, energy, redress and enforcement, financial services, food, health, safety, sustainability and trade policy. Its priorities are defined by BEUC members who meet twice a year at the general assembly and at several experts’ meetings.

BEUC actively campaigns for stronger product safety rules in the EU. The organisation advocated for the adoption of the General Product Safety Regulation (GPSR), which entered into force in December 2024, replacing the previous directive to enhance market surveillance and ensure that dangerous products are swiftly removed from the EU market. Additionally, BEUC has been watching closely the Transatlantic Trade and Investment Partnership (TTIP) negotiations since their start in June 2013, safeguarding consumer interests in Europe. 'The consumer view on TTIP' is a blog signed by BEUC's Director General, Monique Goyens and examines the possible effects that a trade deal between the EU and US might have on consumers.

In 2012, BEUC celebrated its 50th anniversary. Some of the organisation's achievements in consumer-related areas include cross-border bank payments, GMO labelling and personal data protection.

At the international level, BEUC is an associate member of Consumers International, the global federation of consumer groups. Together with CI and other sister organisations, BEUC tackles all areas that impact consumers. ANEC represents European consumers in the creation of technical standards. ICRT is a global organisation active in research and testing. BEUC is also active in the Transatlantic Consumer Dialogue (TACD), a forum of US and EU consumer organisations.

== Members ==
Country	Name of the association
Albania	Qendra Konsumatori shqiptar
Austria	Arbeiterkammer
Austria	Verein für Konsumenteninformation – VKI
Bulgaria	Bulgarian National Association Active Consumers (Aktivni potrebiteli) - BNAAC
Croatia	Unija potrosaca Hrvatske
Cyprus	Cyprus Consumers’ Association - CCA
Czech Republic	dTest
Denmark	Forbrugerrådet Tænk
Finland	Kuluttajaliitto ry
France	Consommation, logement et cadre de vie - CLCV
France	UFC-Que Choisir
Germany	Stiftung Warentest
Germany	Verbraucherzentrale Bundesverband - vzbv
Greece	Association for the Quality of Life - EKPIZO
Greece	Consumers' Protection Center - KEPKA
Hungary	National Federation of Associations for Consumer Protection in Hungary - FEOSZ
Hungary	Tudatos Vásárlók Egyesülete
Iceland	Neytendasamtökin - NS
Ireland	Consumers' Association of Ireland - CAI
Italy	Adiconsum
Italy	Consumatori Italiani per l'Europa - CIE
Latvia	Latvijas Patērētāju interešu aizstāvības asociācija - PIAA
Lithuania	Vartotojų aljansas
Luxembourg	Union luxembourgeoise des consommateurs - ULC
North Macedonia	Organizacija na potrosuvacite na Makedonija - OPM
Malta	ACR Malta
Netherlands	Consumentenbond
Norway	Forbrukerrådet
Poland	Federacja Konsumentów - FK
Poland	Fundacja Konsumentów
Portugal	DECO - Associação Portuguesa para a Defesa do Consumidor
Romania	APC România
Slovakia	Spoločnosť ochrany spotrebiteľov (S.O.S.)
Slovenia	Zveza Potrosnikov Slovenije - ZPS
Spain	Asufin
Spain	Federación de Consumidores y Usuarios – CECU
Sweden	Sveriges Konsumenter
Switzerland	Fédération romande des consommateurs - FRC
United Kingdom	Citizens Advice
United Kingdom	Legal Services Consumer Panel
United Kingdom	The Consumer Council of Northern Ireland
United Kingdom	Which?

== See also ==
- European Food Safety Authority (EFSA)
- International Consumer Research & Testing (ICRT)
- List of consumer organizations
- Super-complaint
- Consumer protection
