= Swedish Consumers' Association =

Swedish consumer organization

The Swedish Consumers' Association (Swedish: Sveriges Konsumenter) is a collaborative consumer organization based in Sweden that works for consumers' interests through increased consumer power. It is an independent, democratically anchored organisation that works through lobbying, opinion formation, and public education. Behind the organization are 19 member organisations. The Swedish Consumers' Association is a member of Consumers International, BEUC, and ANEC.

== Work ==
Swedish Consumers' Association acts nationally, internationally, and within the EU. The organisation owns the consumer test magazine Råd & Rön.

The organization focuses on giving all consumers more power, increased safety, and better possibilities to consume sustainably and consciously. The Swedish Consumer Association works on a wide range of consumer issues, but specifically when it comes to consumer rights, food, excess consumerism, banking services, accessibility, integrity online, and sustainable consumption.

The organization often pursues substantive issues in the form of projects. The Fair Finance Guide is an international initiative to increase transparency in how sustainably banks invest.

== Blåslampan ==
The consumer prize Blåslampan is awarded every year by The Swedish Consumers' Association and the magazine Råd & Rön. It goes to a person, organization, or company that has protected the interests of consumers in an inspiring and innovative way. The winner receives 10 000 kronor, an antique blowtorch trophy, and a subscription to Råd & Rön – and of course, the honor.

== History ==
Swedish Consumers' Association was founded in 1992 to strengthen the role of consumers in Sweden and the EU. A main reason was the EU, which opened up influence in various bodies for non-profit consumer organizations.

In 2006 the organization took over the ownership of the magazine Råd & Rön from the Consumer Agency. And in the same year the name was changed from The Swedish Consumer Council to The Swedish Consumers' Association.

Since 2008 the Swedish Consumers' Association has offered consumer counseling in municipalities and organizations through KonsumentCentrum.
