= International Consumer Research & Testing =

International Consumer Research & Testing (ICRT) is a global consortium of more than 40 consumer organisations dedicated to carrying out joint research and testing in the consumer interest.

ICRT's principal objectives are to facilitate co-operation between its members and to promote research and testing in the field of consumer goods and services.

== ICRT Tests ==
ICRT members cooperate in a programme of continuous testing on a wide range of popular consumer products such as digital cameras, mobile phones, television sets, cars, washing machines, dishwashers, vacuum cleaners and light bulbs.

In addition, there are numerous other smaller collaborative tests, on a whole range of consumer products from anti-wrinkle creams to athletic shoes.

Safety has always been a topic of concern to consumer organisations. ICRT members have played a key role in promoting higher safety standards for consumer goods.

ICRT also facilitates information exchange and testing between members in areas such as food, health, the environment and financial services.

ICRT members join forces with motor clubs with the aim of testing cars, tyres and infant car seats. ICRT is a key player in European New Car Assessment Programme (Euro NCAP) and a similar programme in Latin America.

== ICRT Members ==
All ICRT member organisations act exclusively in the consumer interest. They do not accept advertising and are independent of commerce, industry and political parties. Werner Brinkmann is the German member of the board of ICRT. ICRT works closely with the two other international campaigning consumer organisations, to which many ICRT members also belong:

- BEUC - The European Consumer Organisation
- CI - Consumers International

Member organisations range in size from the largest consumer organisations worldwide with memberships between 200,000 and 7 million to smaller organisations with less than 10,000 members.

ICRT's major members are: Which? (United Kingdom), Consumer Reports (United States of America), Stiftung Warentest (Germany), Association des Consommateurs Test Achats (Belgium), Union Fédérale des Consommateurs Que Choisir (France), Consumentenbond (Netherlands). ICRT has member organisations in Europe, Asia Pacific, Latin America and Africa.

- Argentina - Consumidores Argentinos
- Australia - Choice
- Austria - Verein Fur Konsumenteninformation
- Belgium - Association des Consommateurs Test-Achats SC
- Brazil - Pro Teste - Associacao Brasiliera de Defesa do Consumidor
- Bulgaria - Bulgarian National Consumers Association
- Canada - Protegez-Vous
- Chile - The Organisation for the Defence of Consumers and Users in Chile
- China - Association for Comparative & Objective Testing in Europe for Safety & Trust e.V.
- China - Okoer (no site)
- China - Mingjian (License)
- China - Shenzhen Consumer Council (no site)
- Cyprus - Cyprus Consumers' Association
- Czech Republic - Consumer Organisation dTest
- Denmark - Taenk/Forbrugerraadet (Danish Consumer Council)
- Finland - Kuluttajatietoisuuden edistamisyhdistys ry. (Association for advancing consumer awareness)
- France - Que Choisir Ensemble (ex-UFC)
- Germany - Stiftung Warentest
- Hungary - Teszt es Piac Fogyasztovedelmi Egyesulet
- Hungary -Association of Conscious Consumers
- Greenland - Greenlands Forbrugerrad
- China - Hong Kong Consumer Council
- Iceland - Neytendasamtokin
- Ireland - Consumer's Association of Ireland
- Italy - Altroconsumo Edizioni SRL
- Japan - National Consumer Affairs Center of Japan (Affiliate)
- Korea - Citizens' Alliance for Consumer Protection of Korea
- Netherlands - Consumentenbond
- New Zealand - Consumer New Zealand
- Norway - Forbrukerradet
- Peru - Peruvian Association of Consumers and Users
- Poland - Pro-Test Foundation
- Portugal - DECO-Proteste Editores LDA
- National Association for Consumer Protection and Promotion of Programs and Strategies Romania
- Romania - Romania Association for Consumer Protection
- Russia - Konfop
- Russia - RusQuality
- Singapore - Consumers Association of Singapore
- Slovenia - Zveza Potrosnikov Slovenije
- South Africa - National Consumer Forum of South Africa
- Spain - Ediciones SA (OCU)
- Sweden - Rad & Ron
- Switzerland - Federation Romande des Consommateurs
- Switzerland - Konsumenteninfo AG
- Switzerland - Stiftung fur Konsumentenschutz
- Taiwan - Consumer Foundation of Chinese Taipei
- Thailand - Foundation for Consumers
- Ukraine - Test
- UK - Which?
- USA - Consumer Reports

== History ==
ICRT was formally set up as a not for profit association under United Kingdom law in 1990 but it is based on a long tradition of co-operation between independent consumer organisations since the 1960s:

- 1968 – The first joint tests between the Dutch and Belgian organisations included hairdryers, dishwashers, stereo receivers and model trains. A test of hotels in Mallorca was also joined by Germany.
- 1972 – The name European Testing Group (ETG) was adopted.
- 1974 – By now twelve organisations were attending ETG meetings including those from The Netherlands, Belgium, Germany, UK, France, Denmark, Norway, Switzerland and Austria.
- 1982 – ETG Secretariat moved to London and an increasing number of collaborative tests were carried out each year
- 1990 – A new organisation – International Consumer Research & Testing was created to formalise the arrangements of the ETG.
- 1991 – First European Commission (EC)-funded project “Comparative Testing in Europe” completed. This laid the basis for discussion about future ICRT EC-funded comparative testing projects.
- 1992 – First ICRT Guidelines issued
- 1996 – ICRT became a founder member of the Euro NCAP crash test programme
- 1999 – Guido Adriaenssens appointed CEO. ICRT now has 26 members
- 2002 – Nordic Testing Group formed.
- 2004 – Consumers Union (USA) joins ICRT, Asia-Pacific Regional Group met for the first time
- 2007–2010 Capacity building in new EU Member States lead to formation of Central & Eastern Europe Regional Group in 2010
- 2008 – Worldwide test on breakfast cereals published – joined by 30 partners
- 2010 – Latin NCAP launched
- 2011 – launch of Global NCAP
- 2017 – ICRT has more than 35 member organisations
