= Euroconsumers =

Luxembourgish multinational corporation

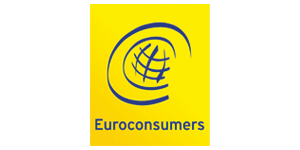
Euroconsumers logo

Euroconsumers: Consumer Organization in Europe, previously known as Conseur - European Consumers, is a private independent multinational corporation, based in Luxembourg, that works in Belgium, Spain, Portugal, Italy, Luxembourg and Brazil, representing 1.5 million households.

The main objectives of Euroconsumers are to promote and defend consumer interests, such as freedom of choice, access to information, education and justice, and right to health, safety and a healthy environment.

Euroconsumers is an umbrella for a number of national consumer organizations, co-ordinating their actions at a European level with regard to customers of airlines, nutritional information on food packaging, technology, and social media. Their class action lawsuit against Facebook led to a groundbreaking decision in an Italian regional court on the value of private data.

Member organizations include:

- Testachats (Belgium)
- OCU (Spain), called "Organizacion de Consumidores y Usuarios"
- Deco Proteste (Portugal)
- Altroconsumo (Italy)
- Proteste (Brazil)

On 1 January 2026, the members of Euroconsumers left BEUC, a larger association representing consumers in Europe.
