= Trans Atlantic Consumer Dialogue =

The Transatlantic Consumer Dialogue was founded in 1998 as a forum for transatlantic discussions on Intellectual rights, Internet society, and food between and among consumer organizations in the United States and European Union. Members include The European Consumers' Organisation, the American Civil Liberties Union, Electronic Frontier Foundation, Privacy International, Consumers Union and Consumer Federation of America

The Transatlantic Consumer Dialogue holds a conference once a year, alternately in U.S.A and the EU

Some activities have been funded by Open Society Institute.
