= Consumer organization =

Type of advocacy groups

Consumer organizations are advocacy groups that seek to protect people from corporate abuse like unsafe products, predatory lending, false advertising, astroturfing and pollution.

Consumer Organizations may operate via protests, litigation, campaigning, or lobbying. They may engage in single-issue advocacy (e.g., the British Campaign for Real Ale (CAMRA), which campaigned against keg beer and for cask ale) or they may set themselves up as more general consumer watchdogs, such as the Consumers' Association in the UK.

One common means of providing consumers useful information is the independent comparative survey or test of products or services, involving different manufacturers or companies (e.g., Which?, Consumer Reports, etc.).

Another arena where consumer organizations have operated is food safety. The needs for campaigning in this area are less easy to reconcile with their traditional methods, since the scientific, dietary or medical evidence is normally more complex than in other arenas, such as the electric safety of white goods. The current standards on mandatory labelling, in developed countries, have in part been shaped by past lobbying by consumer groups.

The aim of consumer organizations may be to establish and to attempt to enforce consumer rights. Effective work has also been done, however, simply by using the threat of bad publicity to keep companies' focus on the consumers' point of view.

Consumer organizations may attempt to serve consumer interests by relatively direct actions such as creating and/or disseminating market information, and prohibiting specific acts or practices, or by promoting competitive forces in the markets which directly or indirectly affect consumers (such as transport, electricity, communications, etc.).

== History ==
Two precursor organizations to the modern consumer organization are standards organizations and consumers leagues. Both of these appeared in the United States around 1900.

Trade associations and professional societies began to establish standards organizations to reduce industry waste and increase productivity. Consumer leagues modeled themselves after trade unions in their attempts to improve the market with boycotts in the same way that trade unions sought to improve working conditions with strike action.

== Consumer organizations by country ==
=== International consumer organizations ===
- Consumers International - International NGO
- ANEC (Europe; focus on standardization)
- BEUC (Europe; French: Bureau Européen des Unions de Consommateurs)
- ICRT The only independent international organization for consumer research and testing

=== National organizations ===
==== Australia ====
- Consumers' Federation of Australia
- Australian Consumers Association

==== Botswana ====
- Consumer Watchdog

==== Canada ====
- Consumers' Association of Canada
- Consumers Council of Canada
- Option consommateurs

==== Fiji ====
- Consumer Council of Fiji
- Fiji Consumers Association

==== France ====
- Association de défense d'éducation et d'information du consommateur (ADEIC)
- Association Contre les Abus des Banques Européennes (ACABE)
- Association Force ouvrière des consommateurs (AFOC)
- Association Léo-Lagrange de défense du consommateur (ALLDC)
- Confédération générale du logement (CGL)
- Confédération nationale du logement (CNL)
- Association pour l'information et la défense des consommateurs salariés (Indecosa-CGT)
- Confédération nationale des associations familiales catholiques (CNAFC)
- Conseil national des associations familiales laïques (CNAFAL)
- Confédération syndicale des familles (CSF)
- Consommation Logement Cadre de vie (CLCV)
- Familles de France (FF)
- Familles rurales (FR)
- Fédération nationale des associations d'usagers des transports (FNAUT)
- Union fédérale des consommateurs - Que choisir (UFC-Que Choisir)
- Union nationale des associations familiales (UNAF)

==== Germany ====
- Stiftung Warentest
- Deutscher Konsumentenbund
- Foodwatch
- Verbraucherzentrale

==== Hong Kong ====
- Consumer Council

==== India ====
- Consumer Guidance Society of India

==== Ireland ====
- Consumers' Association of Ireland
- The National Consumer Agency (NCA) is a statutory body that defends consumer interests in the Republic of Ireland

==== Israel ====
- המועצה הישראלית לצרכנות (Consumer Council Israel)

==== Japan ====
- Consumers Union of Japan (founded in 1969)
- Japan Offspring Fund (founded in 1984)

==== Netherlands ====
Logo of the Consumentenbond

- The Consumentenbond (founded in 1953), over 600,000 members.

Aside from this general consumer organisation, the Netherlands is home to many categorical consumer organisations whose working terrain is limited to a certain part of the markets. Examples of categorical organisations include:

- The Vereniging Eigen Huis ("Own House Association", for house owners; over 650,000 members)
- The Vereniging Consument & Geldzaken ("Consumer & Monetary Affairs Association", for financial consumers, of banking and insurance products; 32,000 members)
- The Woonbond ("League for Living", for renters)

Finally, there is a business regulation agency, charged with competition oversight, sector-specific regulation of several sectors, and enforcement of consumer protection laws:

- The Netherlands Authority for Consumers and Markets

==== Singapore ====
- Competition and Consumer Commission of Singapore (CCCS) is a statutory board to oversight consumer protection and anti-competition malpractices (e.g. price fixing, bid rigging, market sharing and production control) in markets.
- Consumer Association of Singapore (CASE) is a NGO that promotes consumer interests and fair trading.

==== Switzerland ====
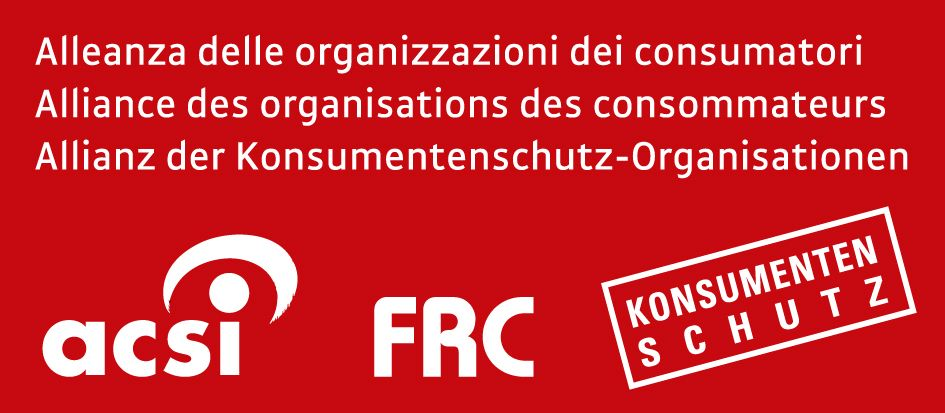
The Swiss Alliance of Consumer Organisations

The Swiss Alliance of Consumer Organisations is the umbrella organisation of the three Swiss consumer organisations (the Stiftung für Konsumentenschutz (SKS) of German-speaking Switzerland, the Fédération romande des consommateurs (FRC) of French-speaking Switzerland and the Associazione consumatrici e consumatori della Svizzera italiana (ACSI) of Italian-speaking Switzerland).

==== United Kingdom ====
Which? is the most influential UK consumers association.

In the United Kingdom, the Enterprise Act 2002 allows consumer bodies that have been approved by the Secretary of State for Trade and Industry to be designated as "super-complainants" to the Competition and Markets Authority. These super-complainants are intended to, "strengthen the voice of consumers," who are "unlikely to have access individually to the kind of information necessary to judge whether markets are failing for them." Eight have been designated as of 2007:

- CAMRA, a lobbying group concerned with the tradition and quality of beer
- The Citizens Advice Bureau, a free service that provides legal advice, practical help and information on consumer rights across the country
- Consumer Council for Water (formerly known as Watervoice)
- Consumer Direct (abolished per 31 March 2012 with its functions being passed to local trading standards departments and Citizens Advice Bureau)
- Consumer Focus (formerly National Consumer Council). The Government announced as part of the October 2010 spending review that Consumer Focus will be abolished, with the Consumer Direct helpline taken over by Citizens Advice. Some of Consumer Focus' functions would transfer to Citizens Advice Bureaux, Citizens Advice Scotland and the General Consumer Council for Northern Ireland following the Public Bodies Act 2011 and any necessary secondary legislation. The transfer is expected to begin April 2013 and be complete by April 2014.
- General Consumer Council of Northern Ireland
- Good Garage Scheme, an automobile repair shop motoring scheme
- Postwatch
- Which? (formerly the Consumers Association), a consumer advocacy organisation which has substantial powers (for example to take representative actions under the Competition Act 1998) but which is primarily a lobbying organisation funded entirely by subscriptions to its regular consumer information magazine

==== United States ====
The Consumers Union was founded in 1936.

- Alliance for Justice
- Better Business Bureau
- Consumer Action
- Consumers' Checkbook
- Consumer Federation of California
- Consumers Union, publishers of Consumer Reports
- Consumer Watchdog, formerly the Foundation for Taxpayer and Consumer Rights
- FlyersRights.org
- Funeral Consumers Alliance
- Public Citizen
- Consumer Federation of America
- Center for Science in the Public Interest (food/nutrition)
- National Consumers League
- U.S. Public Interest Research Group
- CLARIFIED CONSUMER LLC (Consumer Right Advocacy)

== Consumer magazines ==
By 1969 most capitalist countries with developed marketplaces hosted consumer organizations that published consumer magazines which reported the results of product testing. Internationally, the idea of consumer organizations spread from Consumers Union in the United States starting in 1956. The growth of interest in product testing journalism might be explained by increased consumption of mass-marketed products in and before that period. That increased international consumption itself was an effect of the aftermath of World War II.

Consumer magazine circulation
Year magazine started	Magazine	Country	Publisher	Year publisher founded	1969 sales	1975 sales
1936	Consumer Reports	USA	Consumers Union	1936	1,800,000	2,300,000
1953	Consumentengids	Netherlands	Consumentenbond	1953	256,000	470,000
1953	Forbruker Rapporten	Norway	Forbrukerradet (Consumers Council)	1953	169,000	235,000
1957	Which?	UK	Consumers Association	1956	600,000	700,000
1957	Rad och Ron	Sweden	Statens Institut for Konsumenfragor (Institute for Consumer Information)	1957	104,718	n.a.
1959	Test-Achats	Belgium	Association des Consommateurs / Verbruikersunie (AC/V)	1957	102,235	240,000
1959	Choice	Australia	Australian Consumers' Association	1959	67,204	120,000
1961	Rad og Resultater	Denmark	Statens Husholdningsrad (Home Economics Council)	1935	28,100	n.a.
1961	Que Choisir	France	Union Federale des Consommateurs (UFC)	1951	15,000	30,000
1961	Konsument	Austria	Verein fur Konsumenteninformation (VKI)	1960	25,000	n.a.
1963	Canadian Consumer	Canada	Consumers' Association of Canada	1947	43,000	n.a.
1964	Taenk	Denmark	Danske Husmodres Forbrugerrad (Danish Housewives Council)	1947	48,000	n.a.
1965	Il Consumatore	Italy	Unione Nazionale Consumatori	1965	100,000	n.a.
1966	Test	Germany	Stiftung Warentest	1964	68,000	250,000
1970	50 Millions de Consummateurs	France	Institut National de la Consommation	1967	0	300,000
2012	Consumer Voice	Pakistan	Consumer Voice Pakistan	2012	0	n.a

In the 25 years after World War II, there was a correlation between the number of people in a country who were purchasing cars and the popularity of consumer magazines. In some cases, an increase in other consumer purchases seemed to drive popularity of consumer magazines, but the correlation was closest for populations who made decisions about buying cars. The availability of consumer magazines comforted consumers when individuals in society suddenly became overwhelmed with marketplace decisions, and the popularity of magazines seemed to grow as more marketplace decisions became available.

== See also ==
- Consumer protection
- Consumer activism
- List of consumer organizations
- Actor analysis
- Transparency (market)
- Cost the limit of price

== Sources ==
- Hilton, Matthew (2009). Prosperity for all : consumer activism in an era of globalization. Ithaca: Cornell University Press. ISBN 9780801446443.
