= Jof =

JOF is the Japan Offspring Fund.

Jof or JOF may also refer to:

- Jôf di Montasio, a mountain in Italy
- Jof Owen, member of British duo The Boy Least Likely To
- Jof, a character in 1957 film The Seventh Seal
