= PCC Community Markets =

Food cooperative based in Seattle, Washington, US

Puget Consumers Co-op
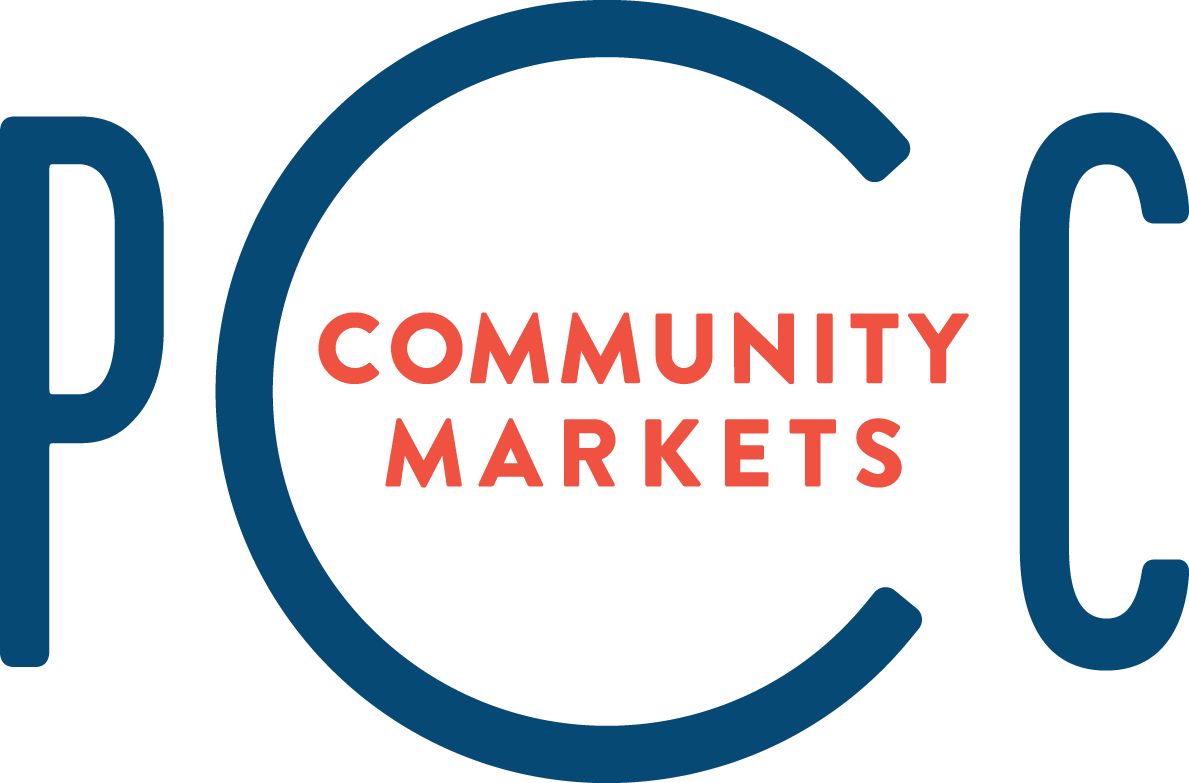
- Trade name: PCC Community Markets
- Type: Consumers' cooperative
- Industry: Grocery store
- Founded: 1953
- Headquarters: Seattle, Washington, United States
- Key people: Krishnan (Krish) Srinivasan, CEO
- Products: Organic food
- Revenue: USD 449.9 million (2024)
- Operating income: USD (1.17 million) (2024)
- Net income: USD 391,493 (2024)
- Members: Over 117,000 (2024)
- Number of employees: 1690 (2024)
- Website: Official website
- Footnotes; Financials as of December 31, 2024.

Puget Consumers Co-op, doing business as PCC Community Markets, is a food cooperative based in Seattle, Washington. With over 125,000 members, it is the largest consumer-owned food cooperative in the United States. Both members and non-members may shop at the retail locations, but members receive certain discounts. The organization currently operates seventeen retail locations. Ten of the seventeen stores are located in Seattle (in the Fremont, Green Lake Village, Green Lake Aurora, Columbia City, View Ridge, West Seattle, Ballard, Downtown Seattle (Corner Market), Madison Valley, and Central District neighborhoods). The West Seattle location reopened on October 2, 2019. The other seven are located in Issaquah, Kirkland, Burien, Bothell, Redmond, Edmonds and Bellevue.

The organization was founded in 1953; it rebranded to PCC Natural Markets in 1998 and then to its current name in 2017.

== Organization ==
PCC is a member-owned and operated cooperative. The members govern through established bylaws and yearly elect a board of trustees who represent the interests of the members. Like other grocery cooperatives, the profits from the retail store operations go directly back into the stores or to the community (through classes, education or charitable efforts).

Current PCC programs include:

- PCC Sound Consumer newspaper
- PCC Cooks classes
- PCC Farmland Trust, a 501(c)(3) dedicated to sustainable organic farming

Candidates on the board of trustees are required to collect 1,000 member signatures to appear on ballots. As of 2021, it has 90,000 members. Two candidates in the 2021 election, both employees endorsed by the United Food and Commercial Workers union, alleged that store managers had called the police on them while gathering signatures in an attempt to dissuade support. The employees were ultimately included in the ballot and won election to the board of trustees, becoming the first store employees to sit on the board since the early 2000s.

== Relationship with Central Co-op ==
In 1978, Capitol Hill Co-op dissolved for financial reasons and, in keeping with the principle that co-operatives cooperate with other cooperatives, PCC agreed to provide technical and financial assistance to the Central Co-op to replace it.

== Pricing ==
According to Consumers' Checkbook magazine, PCC's prices for the limited number of comparable items available were higher than the big-chain average. However, the quality of PCC's fresh produce and meat received very high scores. The prices of organic food at PCC were about the same as the average prices at other stores in the Puget Sound area.

== See also ==
- List of food cooperatives
