= HealthMarkets =

Business

HealthMarkets, Inc.
- Trade name: HealthMarkets
- Formerly: UICI
- Type: Private
- Industry: Insurance
- Founded: 1983
- Headquarters: North Richland Hills, Texas, United States
- Area served: USA
- Website: www.healthmarketsinc.com

HealthMarkets, Inc. formerly known as UICI, is headquartered in North Richland Hills, Texas.

== History ==
HealthMarkets was founded in 1983 by Ronald Jensen under United Insurance Companies, Inc. (UICI) Through its focus on the then-untapped market of self-employed workers, the company was able to grow earnings by more than double between 1984 and 1985. In 1986, UICI made its first public stock offering.

In October 2004, The MEGA Life & Health Insurance Co, a subsidiary of UICI, acquired HealthMarket Inc, which was a small business insurer. Then, in 2005, a group of private equity investors headed by The Blackstone Group acquired HealthMarkets Inc, moving the company from public to private owned. The MEGA Life & Health Insurance Co. brand was officially renamed to HealthMarkets Inc to convey its new consumer focus.

Between 2008 and 2010, several lawsuits were filed against HealthMarkets, Inc., resulting in the Company paying millions of dollars in settlements. The company had concealed her control over not-for-profit organizations Alliance for Affordable Services and National Association for the Self-Employed, among others. As of 2010, HealthMarkets no longer offers Scheduled Benefit plans and has discontinued marketing individually underwritten plans.

== Organization Structure ==
Subsidiaries of HealthMarkets, Inc. include the following entities:

The Chesapeake Life Insurance Company is an underwriting company for both insurance and non-insurance products marketed under the SureBridge brand name.

HealthMarkets Insurance Agency, Inc., formerly known as Insphere Insurance Solutions, Inc., is licensed as an insurance agency in all 50 states. The company offers individual policies as well as life insurance, supplemental insurance, Medicare, dental insurance, vision insurance, and long-term plans from national and regional carriers through a network of more than 3,000 licensed agents, online, or over the phone. HealthMarkets Insurance Agency also includes independent brokerages Excelsior Insurance Brokerage, Inc. and Benefitter Insurance Solutions, a San Francisco-based technology company providing employee benefit decision support tools to brokers, small businesses and their employees.
