= OCU =

OCU may mean:

- Ohio Christian University
- Oklahoma Christian University
- Oklahoma City University
- Operational conversion unit, a unit in an air force
- Operational Command Unit, a unit in a police force
- Operator Control Unit, a hardware or software control interface for an automated system
- Organizacion de Consumidores y Usuarios, a consumer organization in Spain, part of Euroconsumers
- Orthodox Church of Ukraine
- Osaka City University, a public university in Osaka, Japan
- Overseas Chinese University, a university in Taichung, Taiwan
