= Consumer council =

Consumer council may refer to:

- Consumer Council (Hong Kong)
- Consumers Council of Canada
- Consumer Council of Fiji
- Norwegian Consumer Council
