= ICRT =

ICRT may refer to:

- International Community Radio Taipei
- International Consumer Research & Testing
- Instituto Cubano de Radio y Televisión, ie. Cuban Institute of Radio and Television
