= Funeral home =

Death care business

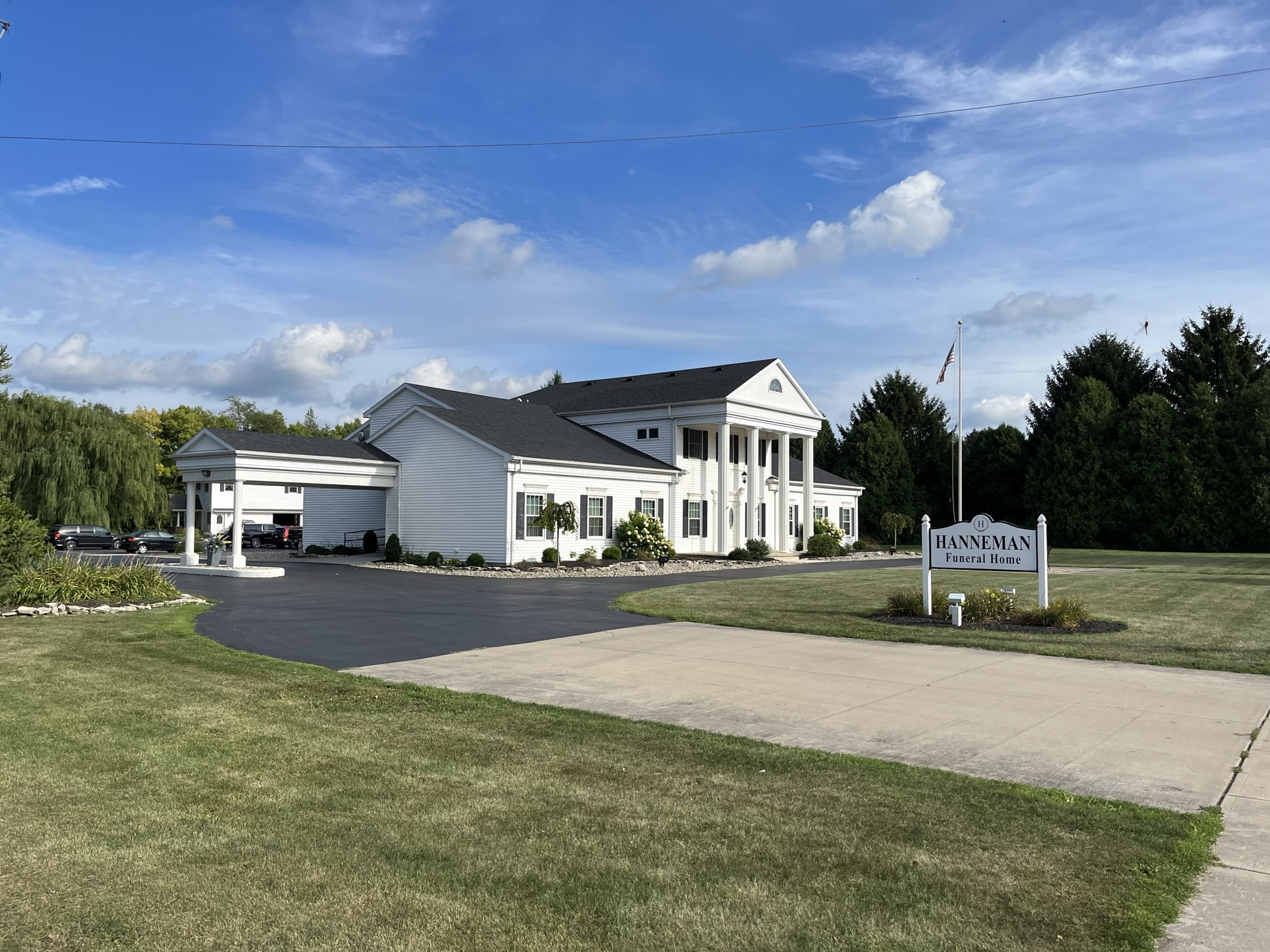
A funeral home in Findlay, Ohio

A funeral home, funeral parlor (funeral parlour in the UK) or mortuary is a business that provides burial, entombment and cremation services for the dead and their families. These services may include a prepared visitation and funeral, and the provision of a chapel for the funeral or memorial service.

== Services ==
Funeral homes arrange services in accordance with the wishes of surviving friends and family, whether immediate next of kin or an executor so named in a legal will. The funeral home often takes care of the necessary paperwork, permits, and other details, such as making arrangements with the cemetery, and providing obituaries to the news media. Its pews do not feature racks behind them like in synagogues and churches. The funeral business has a history that dates to the age of the Egyptians who mastered the science of preservation.

In recent years many funeral homes have started posting obituaries online and use materials submitted by families to create memorial websites.

There are certain common types of services in North America. A traditional funeral service consists of a viewing (sometimes referred to as a visitation), a funeral service in a place of worship or the funeral home chapel and a graveside committal service. Direct cremation consists of the funeral home receiving the body, preparing it for the crematory and filing the necessary legal paperwork. Direct/immediate burial is the forgoing of a funeral ceremony for a prompt, simple burial. Moving a body between mortuaries involves preparing it for shipment in a coffin strapped into an arbitrary or a combination unit (mac pac / airtray). This is common when it is to be buried in a different locality than where the person died.

When a body is brought to a funeral home, it is sometimes embalmed to delay decomposition or to make the viewing of the body more pleasant. The procedure typically involves removing sufficient blood material to accommodate the preservative chemicals and dyes, aspirating the internal organs and setting the facial features. Cosmetics are used with the consent of the family to improve the appearance of face and hands for a more natural look. If the face or hands are disfigured by accident, illness or decomposition, the embalmer may utilize restorative techniques to make them presentable for an "open casket" service. If this is not possible, or the family wishes, the funeral home can perform a "closed casket" service.

The funeral home often sets aside one or more large areas for people to gather at a visitation. This area may contain a space to display the body in a casket to visitors who may pay their respects. Funeral and memorial services may also take place at the funeral home. Many funeral homes offer prearrangement options for those who wish to plan their own funerals.

Several large multi-national corporations in this service field have received exposure from high-profile litigation. The Loewen Group, Inc., received a particularly large jury verdict in Mississippi, which was later found to be in error, as the allegations against Loewen Group proved false. The Canada based company then brought suit against the United States alleging violations under NAFTA in 1998.

Houston based Service Corporation International has also had its share of legal troubles in its operations of both funeral homes and cemeteries. In 2009, a class-action lawsuit was filed against SCI and Eden Memorial Park, one of the cemeteries the corporation manages, based on allegations that remains were being moved around to create additional space for future interments. A settlement of $80 million was reached in 2014.

== See also ==
- Cremation Society of Great Britain
- Funeral Consumers Alliance
- LeMoyne Crematory, historically America's first crematory
- Neptune Society, America's cremation service company

== Image gallery ==
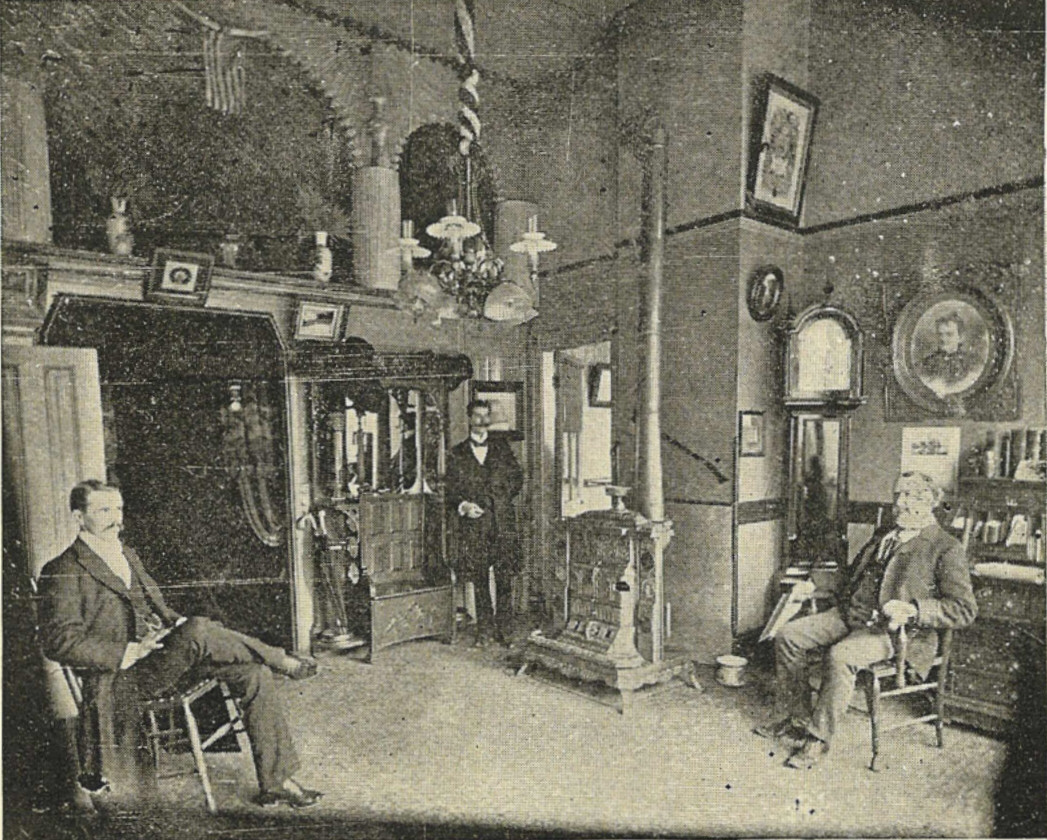
Offices of the Butterworth & Sons mortuary in Seattle, Washington, 1900

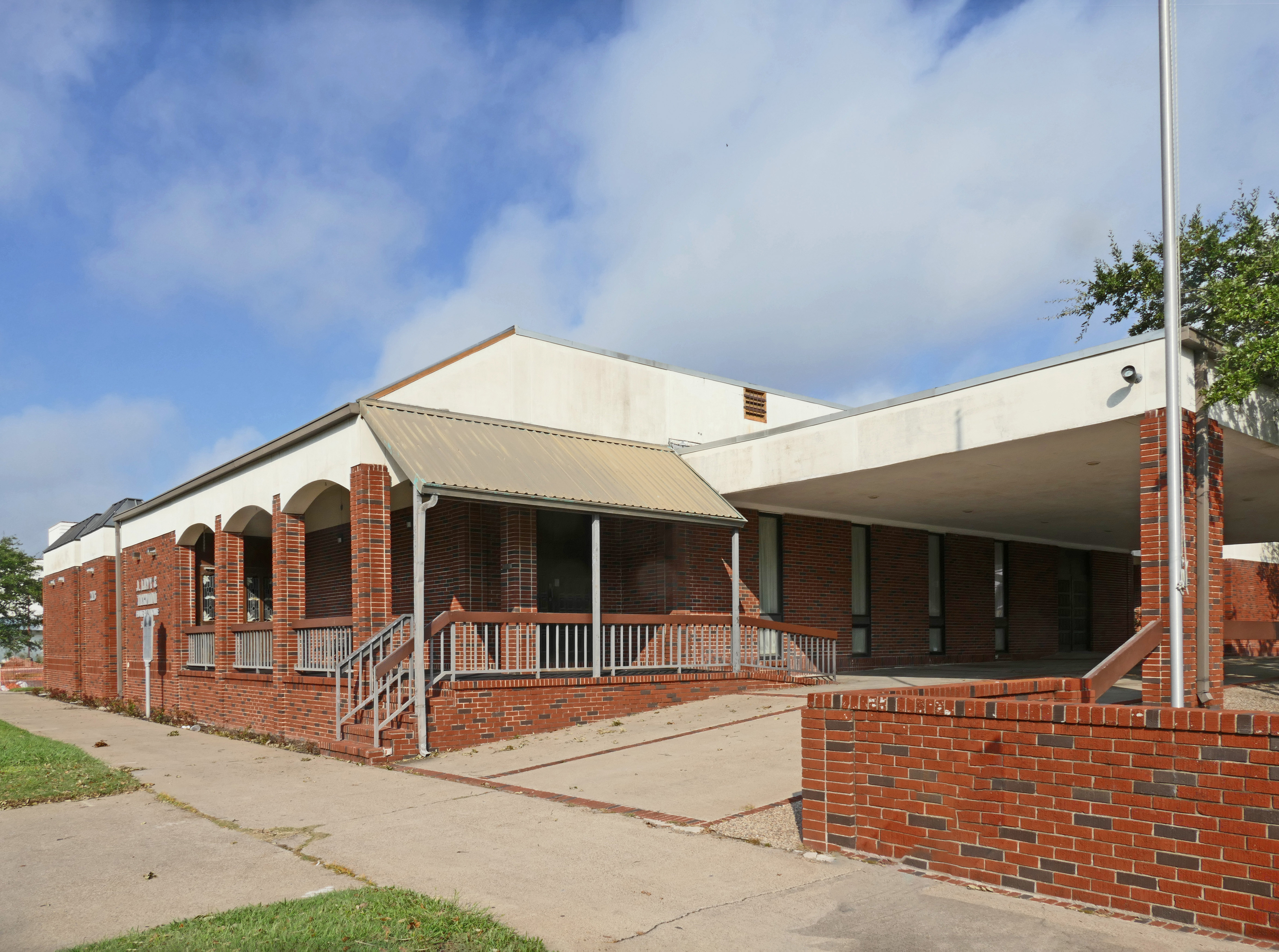
J. Levy & Bro Funeral Home in Galveston

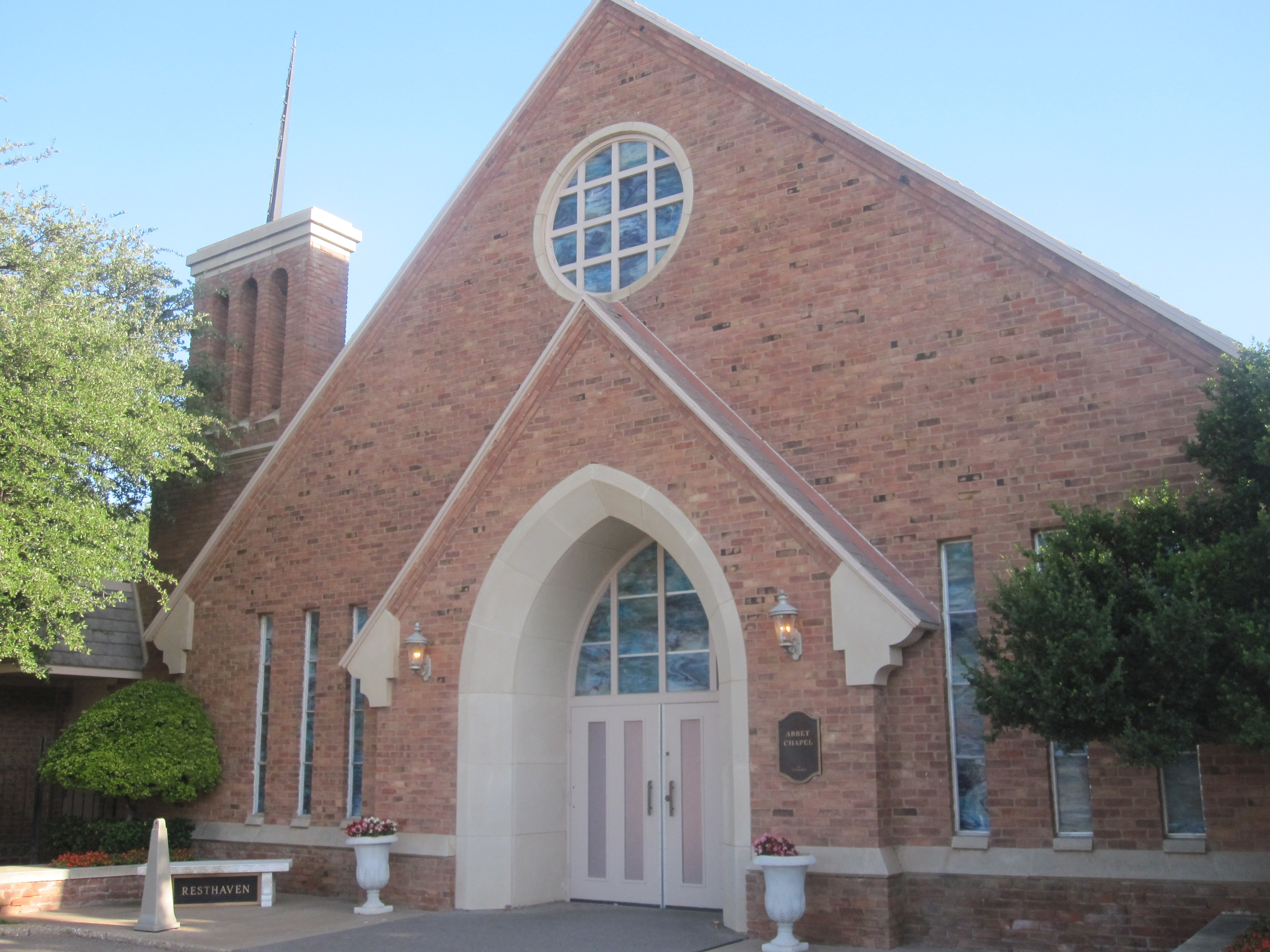
Abbey Chapel at the Resthaven Memorial Park Cemetery in Lubbock, Texas

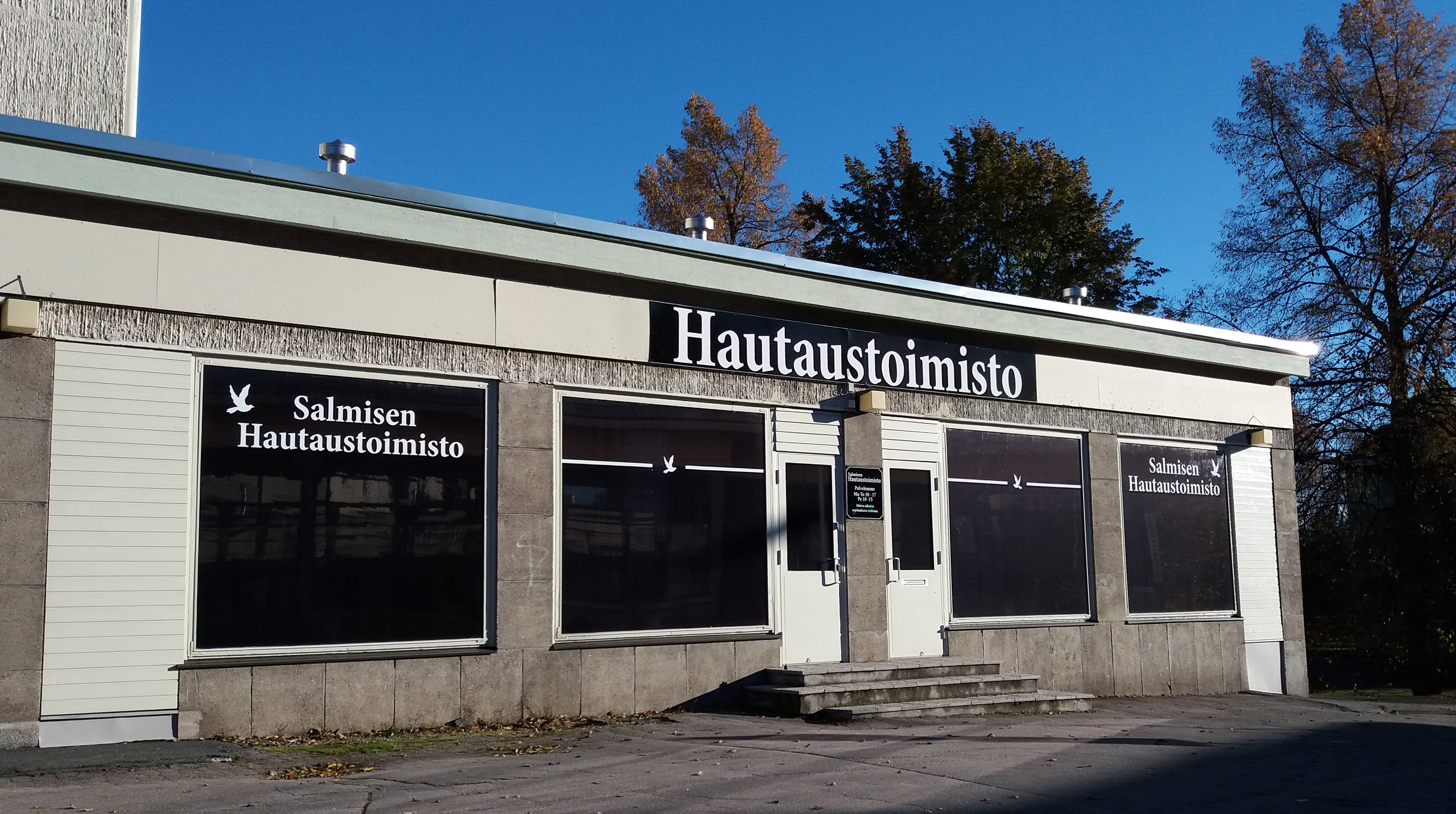
A funeral home Salmisen hautaustoimisto in Jyväskylä, Finland

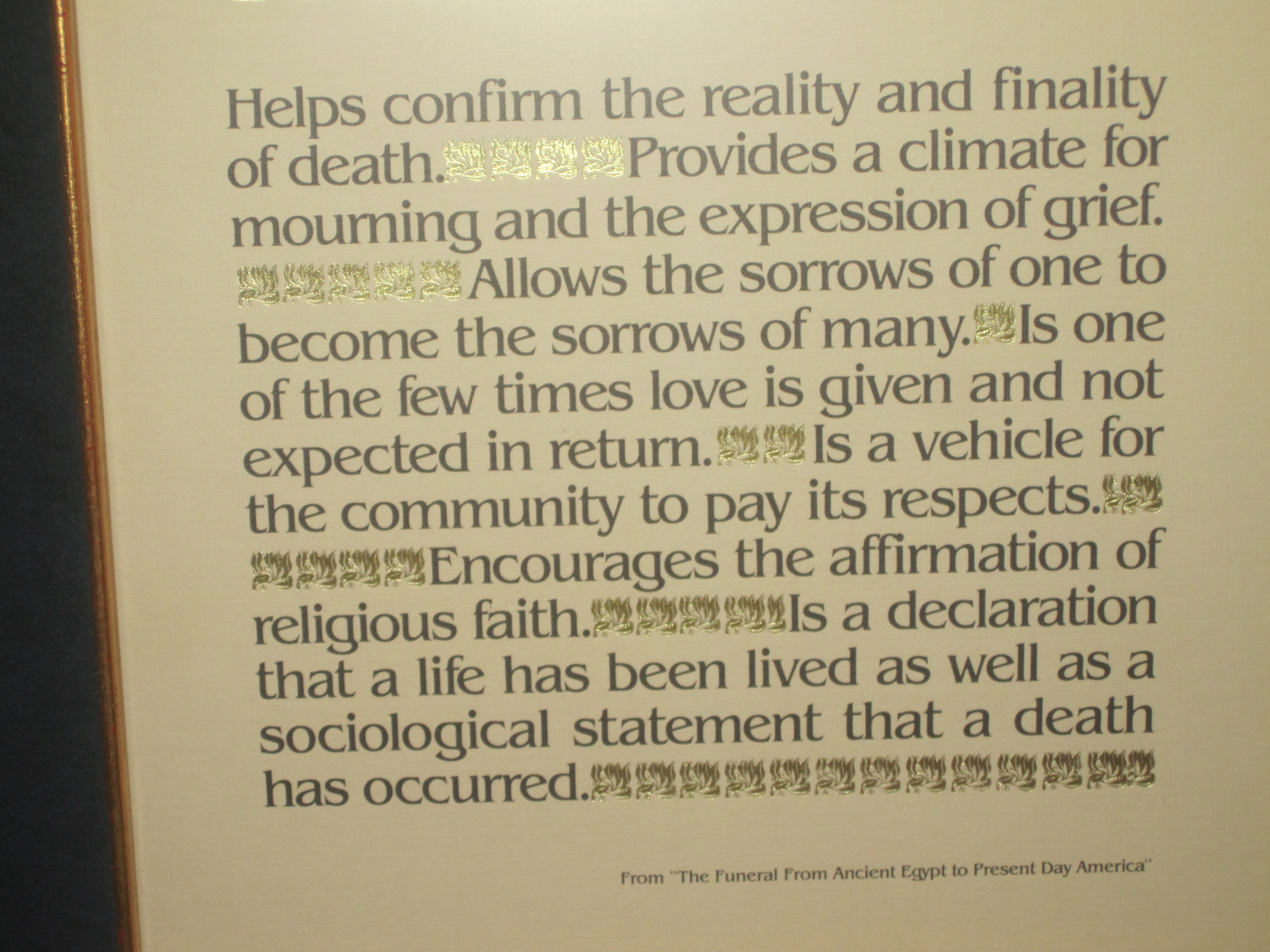
Reasons for funerals, from "The Funeral from Ancient Egypt to Present-day America", Resthaven Memorial Park

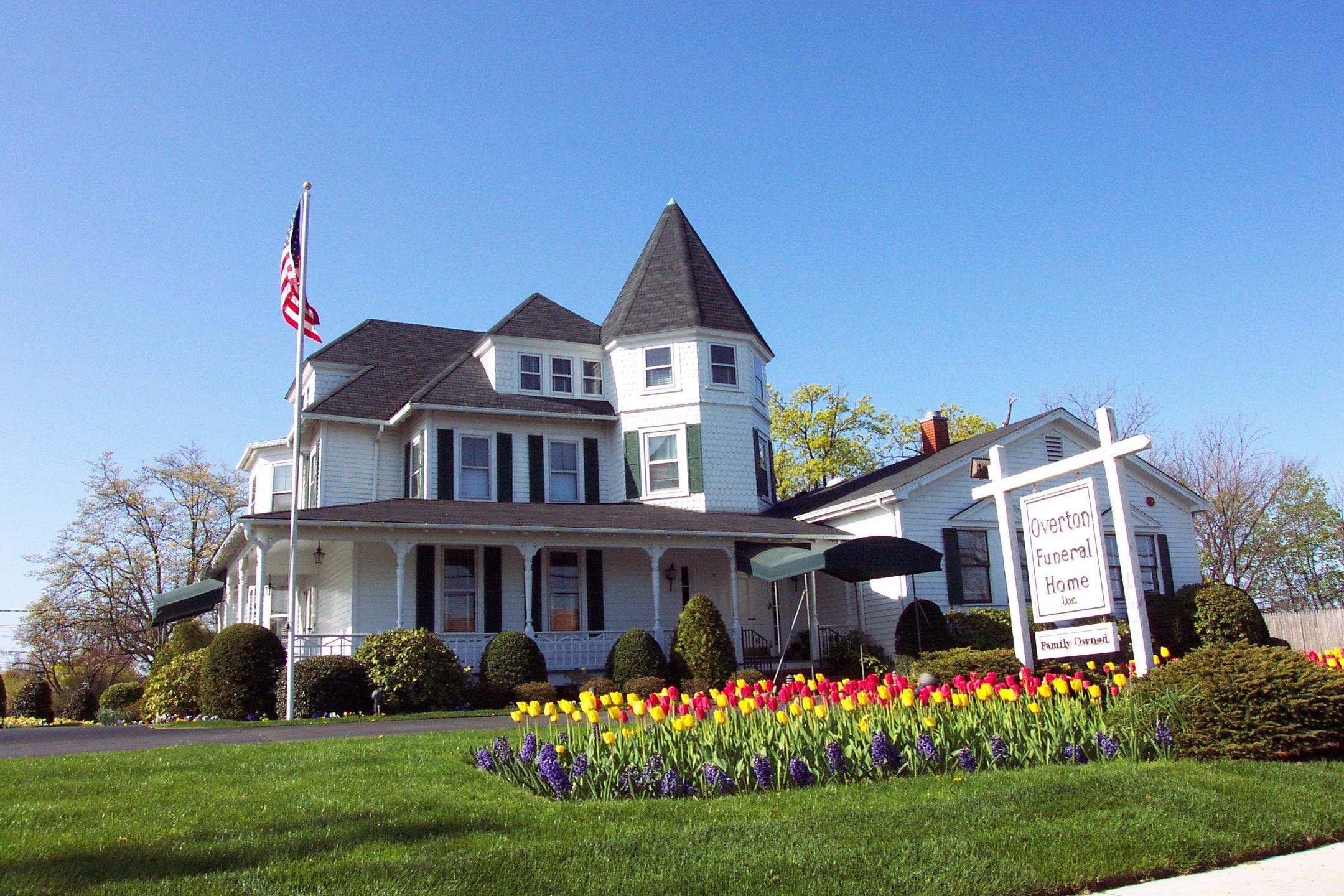
Overton Funeral Home in Islip, New York

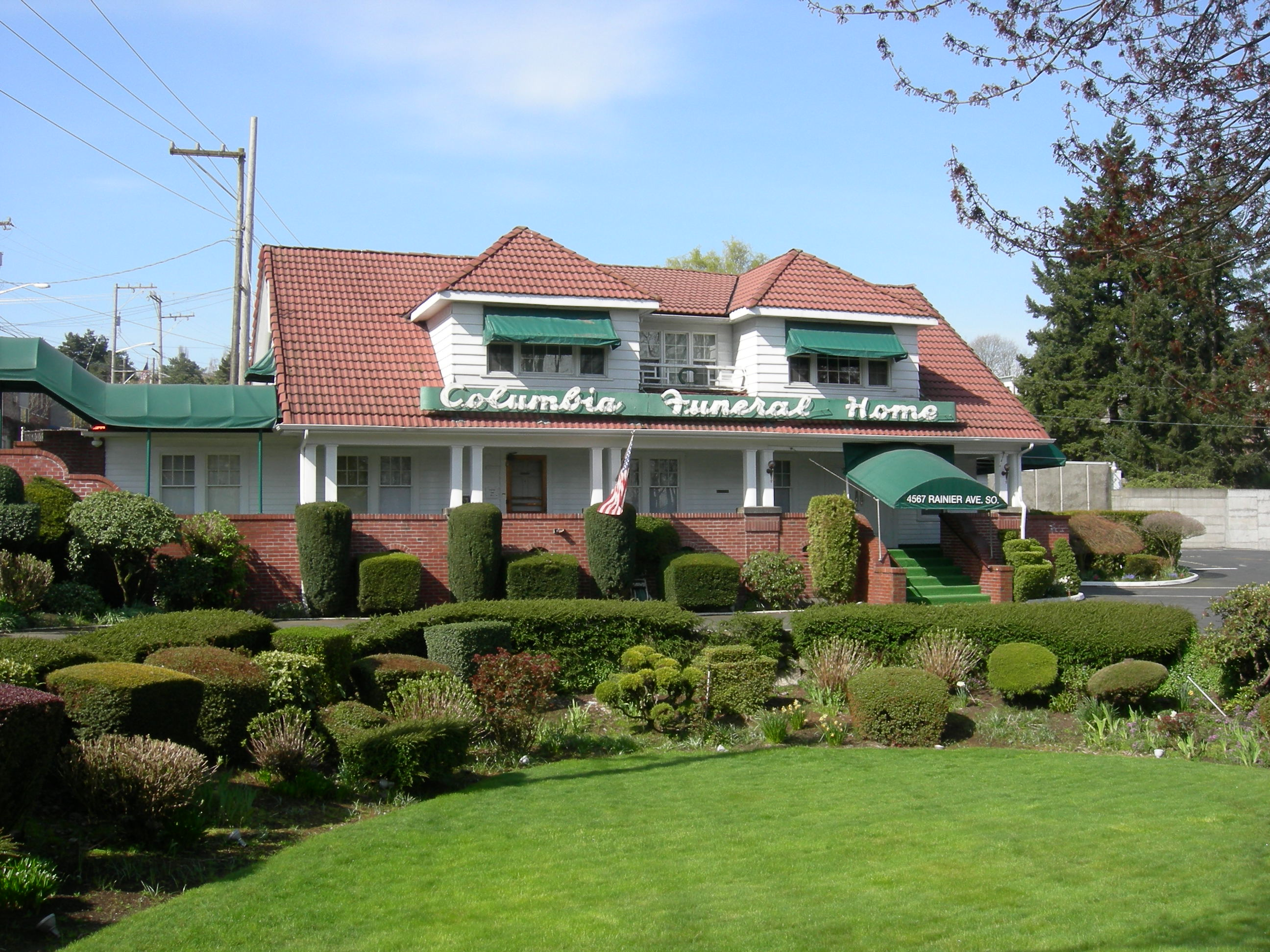
Columbia Funeral Home in Seattle, Washington
