= Maude Rooney =

Irish activist

- Born: Mary Maude Mahony; 1902; County Antrim, Ireland
- Died: 9 December 1974 (aged 71–72); Dublin, Ireland
- Resting place: Glasnevin Cemetery

Maude Rooney (1902 – 9 December 1974) was an Irish consumers' and women's rights activist.

== Early life ==
Maude Rooney was born Mary Maude Mahony in 1902 in County Antrim. She was one of the three sons and three daughters of a retired RIC district inspector and his wife Frances Charlotte. Rooney grew up in Holywood, County Down, and was educated locally. She worked as a secretary to Lord Oranmore and Browne at Castlemargaret, County Mayo. During the Emergency, she was a captain in the voluntary division of the Red Cross from 1939 to 1945. She married Michael Rooney, an insurance official, in 1946 at Westland Row Church, Dublin. The couple lived at Redesdale Road, Mount Merrion, Dublin.

== Advocacy work ==
Rooney joined the Irish Housewives Association (IHA) in 1949. Between 1949 and 1965, Rooney acted as honorary treasurer, minutes secretary, and joint honorary secretary of the IHA. She represented the Association at the women's advisory committee of the institute for industrial research and standards in 1964. Around the same time, Rooney was a member of the IHA's social and international sub-committees, and sat on the editorial board which published The Irish Housewife and later The Irish Housewives' Voice. From 1965 to 1968, Rooney was the chairwoman of the IHA, overseeing the establishment of branches across Ireland, with these branches developing their own agendas.

She attended the fourth biennial conference of the international office of consumers' unions in Israel in June 1966. Taking inspiration from what she saw, Rooney started lengthy discussions within the IHA on consumer protection. This resulted in the decision that Ireland needed a group to concentrate on consumer rights and that this fell outside the remit of the IHA. To start this new group, the IHA convened a meeting of all interested parties on 7 September 1966 in Shelbourne Hotel. This resulted in a steering committee, which then called a public meeting on 29 October 1966 at the Metropole. It was at this meeting that Rooney was elected chairwoman of the newly established Consumers' Association of Ireland. She later became vice-chairman, a position she held until her death. A large amount of her time was given over to being an unpaid complaints officer.

Rooney also served as the IHA representative in a rates study group in 1967, and was part of the IHA delegation to the International Alliance of Women in the same year. At this meeting the UN commission urged the national groups to examine women's status in their respective countries, and to lobby their governments for a national commission on women. Taking on this, Rooney presided over a meeting of numerous Irish women's groups on 30 January 1968 in the Central Hotel, Dublin. She served on the women's advisory committee again in 1971. She was on the leaders of a protest march in Dublin in November 1974 which protested rising prices.

== Death and legacy ==
Rooney died suddenly on 9 December 1974 in Dublin, and is buried in Glasnevin Cemetery. On the day after her death, proposals were submitted to the Irish government by the national consumer advisory council that incorporated many of the ideals she had advocated for throughout her life.
