= Choice (Australian consumer organisation) =

Australian consumer organisation

- Formerly: Australasian Consumers' Association
- Type: Non-profit consumer organisation
- Founded: 1959
- Founders: Ruby Hutchison; Roland Thorp
- Headquarters: Marrickville, New South Wales
- Key people: Monique Perry (CEO)
- Website: www.choice.com.au

Choice (stylised in all caps, officially the Australian Consumers' Association) is an Australian not-for-profit consumer advocacy organisation. It is an independent, membership-based organisation founded in 1959 that researches and campaigns on behalf of Australian consumers. It is similar to the Consumers Union in the United States and Which? in the United Kingdom, who are considered sister organisations. It is the largest consumer organisation in Australia.

== Operations ==
According to Choice, their job is to stand up against companies doing the wrong thing. The aim of the organisation is to provide up-to-date information across a wide range of consumer issues that allows individuals to make informed consumer decisions. It also lobbies for change on behalf of consumers when required. Choice tests and rates a range of products and services, including appliances, baby products, electronics and home entertainment, computers, food and health, and financial products and services. More than 200,000 people subscribe to the Choice magazine and website.

In 2003, revenue for the organisation was over $10m and by 2019 had grown to over $20m. It is a multi-faceted business with a staff of over 130, which includes the scientists and technicians who test the products, policy specialists who devise campaigns, lobby politicians and speak on issues, as well as the journalists who write for Choice.

Choice buys most of the products it tests on the open market. Its income is mainly derived from subscriptions and from the sale of its publications and products.

== Campaigns and policy ==
Choice also campaigns on behalf of consumers and is a representative on many national and state-based government committees, councils and independent bodies related to consumer rights and issues including food regulation and labelling, health and financial services, telecommunications and digital technology, standards codes, ecologically sustainable development and the environment.

The organisation also holds the annual "Shonky Awards" that highlight dubious or dishonest behaviour. They name and shame that year's most suspect products and companies.

Every year Choice and the Australian Competition & Consumer Commission host the Ruby Hutchison Memorial Lecture presenting consumer and rights topics.

== History ==
Following World War II, the economy and population of Australia was booming, but it was becoming clear that consumers did not have much guidance or protection.

Ruby Hutchison, the first woman to be elected to the Western Australian Legislative Council, had been receiving complaints from her constituents about the quality and value for money of goods. She knew of overseas consumer organisations in the US and UK, so she found out how they worked with a goal of creating something similar in Australia.

By the late 1950s there was an increase in market competition, a fall in product standards and what was seen as industry-wide manipulation by marketers. It was in this context that in 1959 Hutchison travelled to Sydney to discuss her idea with a group of like-minded people, including Roland Thorp, Professor of Pharmacology at the University of Sydney. Discussions culminated at public meeting on 17 September 1959 at the Sydney Town Hall with the establishment of the Australasian Consumers' Association, which was renamed the Australian Consumers' Association in 1963. The primary aim was to produce a magazine that would inform consumers about their rights and about products, their value and safety.

The first magazine was launched in April 1960 and distributed to 500 subscribers. Membership grew quickly and in 1961 the organisation was represented at an international Conference of Consumers’ Associations in The Hague, where it became a founding member of the International Organisation of Consumers Unions (IOCU — now Consumers International, CI), along with consumer organisations in the US, UK, Belgium and the Netherlands.

At first, the Australian Consumers' Association reprinted material from its UK and US counterparts. In 1962 it participated in the first international IOCU test (of watches). It also conducted tests in university labs outside work hours and established a scientific testing panel. The experts on the panel were responsible for one test each per year, which they'd oversee on behalf of the ACA and the organisation established a reputation for thoroughly verifying its test data.

In 1983, Choice moved from Chippendale to Marrickville, where its head office and laboratories are still located.

=== List of chairpeople ===
- Justice Paul Stein 1974-1986
- Wayne Haylen 1988–1994
- Chris Field 2002–2006
- Jenni Mack 2006–2013
- Nicole Rich 2013–2017
- Sandra Davey 2017–2020
- Anita Tang and Robert Southerton, co-chair 2020–2022
- Anita Tang and Nic Cola, co chair 2022-2025
- Fiona Jolly and Nic Cola, co chair 2025
- Nic Cola, 2026 - present

== Choice magazine ==
Choice
- Managing Editor: Margaret Rafferty
- Categories: Consumer advocacy
- Frequency: Monthly
- Publisher: Australian Consumers' Association
- First issue: April 1960
- Country: Australia
- Based in: Marrickville, New South Wales
- Language: English
- Website: choice.com.au
- ISSN: 0009-496X

Choice is a publication of the Australian consumer organisation of that name, a non-profit organisation founded in 1959 (as the Australian Consumers' Association) to research and advocate on behalf of Australian consumers.

=== History and profile ===
Choice was established in 1960 by Ruby Hutchison and Roland Thorp. The magazine tests and compares different consumer products and services and reports their findings. It is published eleven times per year. The headquarters is in Marrickville, New South Wales.

=== Other publications ===
The organisation publishes several products including:

- Choice magazine — a monthly magazine, published eleven times a year.
- Choice Computer — a magazine, published six times a year (discontinued).
- Choice Health Reader — Reports on developments in the health area, published ten times a year (discontinued).
- Choice Books — various titles, including The Choice Guide to Baby Products and Sustainable House.

== The Shonky Awards ==
Choice also holds the annual "Shonky Awards" that highlight dubious or dishonest behaviour from companies. The awards help consumers to identify the worst of the worst, and name and shame that year's shonkiest products and companies. "Shonky" is Australian slang meaning "unreliable, unsound, dishonest, poor or of dubious quality; shoddy".

=== Notable past Shonky Award winners ===
- Commonwealth Bank - 2025 - The Shonky Award for making bank off the back of Australia’s poorest.
- Qantas Airline - 2022 - for being the Spirit of Disappointment.
- Retailer Harvey Norman - 2020 - for their partnership with Latitude Finance, which Choice called "one of Australia's most predatory finance companies". It was revealed vulnerable people with low financial literacy had been signed up for credit cards in-store.
- The Australian pet insurance industry - 2019 - "For catch-22 pet insurance whose conditions make it worthless". "Bad insurance riddled with exclusions".
- The Ikea Nedkyld refrigerator - 2019 - "Failed on so many fronts", "it uses a lot more electricity than it claims on its energy star rating label. It's also one of the worst performing fridges we've seen", "you're also going to be paying extra for replacing all the spoiled food".
- The KitchenAid 2-Slice toaster - 2018 - ($189) "Loaded it, and waited for the familiar pop, only to pluck out slightly dried, warm bread - even on the highest browning setting".
- The Australian divisions of Honda, Toyota, Lexus, BMW and Mazda - 2017 - "For repeatedly failing to disclose a safety device that can actually kill you. The recall of Takata airbags".
- Nature's Way Kids Smart natural medicines - 2012 - "This range of homeopathic 'remedies' for children was deemed "an affront to public health and medical science".
- Peachy Pink briefs - 2011 - "Peach-infused super-tight pants also got a nod, with their "clinically-proven" weight loss effect. The ethos of the test lab behind the clinical trial, Spincontrol Laboratories, didn't exactly fill us with confidence".
- The Power Balance wristband - 2010 - "The only power this bracelet seems to have, placebo effect notwithstanding, is in tipping its distributor's bank balance well and truly into the black".
- L'Oréal Elvive - 2009 - "With their dizzying names for miracle ingredients proven in so-called clinical trials - which they clarify in the fine print as 'consumer perception' studies."
- Nutella Hazelnut Spread - 2007 - "'Less fat than most peanut butters, less sugar than most jam' say the ads. Maybe, but equally it contains more sugar than most peanut butters and more fat than jam".

Two of the 2017 Shonky Award finalists were referred on to the Australian Competition & Consumer Commission for alleged breaches of Australian Consumer Law. Finalist Coles Complete Cuisine cat food was referred on for misleading labelling and contradictory claims in the small print. Also, finalist Nature's Way (Pharmacare Laboratories) Kids Smart Vita Gummies was referred on for potentially misleading consumers about the supplement's health benefits for children and failing to list the amount of sugar contained in each serving.

== Controversy ==
In 2018 the company Australian Hearing was prosecuted and fined for multiple breaches of competition and consumer laws. At the time of the breaches in 2017, the company was led by Bill Davidson who at the time was also the Deputy Chairman of Choice. Choice issued a statement rebuking Australian Hearing's actions after Davidson had left Australian Hearing in early 2018.

== See also ==
- Consumers' Federation of Australia
- Consumer protection
