= Deutscher Konsumentenbund =

Deutscher Konsumentenbund (German Consumers' Federation) is a European consumer advocacy group based in Kassel. It is a non-profit organization and registered with the European Commission to be a consumer rights lobby group with claimed 2,500 members. It submits stakeholder opinions to European Commission and appeared before the State government of Hesse in stakeholder hearing and Hessian antitrust state authority.

== Political positions ==
The organisation is one of the few European non-industrially backed groups that advocate free market solutions that enhance transparency instead of tightening regulations and imposing paternalistic measures.

Also the organization strongly criticizes state-run monopoly structures, e.g. when supplying goods that are regarded "public goods", especially if reward is made by collection taxes (local rates) rather than demanding prices. It has been very active lobbying in favor of a reform on antitrust laws to allow antitrust authorities to control local monopoly structures by means of prices comparison and simulated competition in cases where no state of competition can be reached.

Deutscher Konsumentenbund criticizes local community tax laws currently in effect in Germany and has formed a coalition to alter or abolish the current legal structures.

== General consumer information and protection ==
The organization offers general consumer information and consumer protection services publishing Rapex warnings in German language and offering assistance with so called "subscription traps" and Airline passenger rights.

== Fair Water Group ==
Deutscher Konsumentenbund established a "Fair Water Group" that organizes grass root movements, individuals and organizations critical of the current legal framework for community taxation.
