= Option consommateurs =

Non-profit Canadian consumer organization

- Formation: 1983
- Type: Consumer organization
- Legal status: Active
- Purpose: Consumer advocacy
- Headquarters: Montreal, Quebec, Canada
- Region served: Canada
- Official language: English, French
- Executive director: Éliane Hamel
- Website: www.option-consommateurs.org/en/

Option consommateurs is a non-profit consumer organization dedicated to promoting and defending the interests of Canadian consumers.

The organization was founded in 1983 and is based in Montreal. Its focus areas are energy, agri-food, financial services, privacy, and commercial practices.

Through the Éconologis program, an energy efficiency program for low-income households run by the Quebec government's Ministry of Energy and Natural Resources, Option consommateurs has offered free visits to low-income households in Montréal, wherein consumers are given personalized advice to improve their energy consumption, as well as new electronic thermostats.

== Objectives ==
To achieve its mission, Option consommateurs pursues four objectives:

- Promoting a respectful vision of socioeconomic rights and interests of consumers;
- Empowering consumers and promoting their independence by helping, informing and representing their interests to decision makers;
- Helping to balance the power between companies and consumers, and;
- Promoting equitable legal and contractual rules with regard to consumers and businesses, ensuring their implementation and their respect.

== Activity ==
Option consommateurs is leading a class action lawsuit application filed in the Superior Court of Quebec on 22 March 2022 against several meat-processing companies, which are accused of conspiring to restrict competition in the production, supply, and sale of beef in Quebec. Sylvie De Bellefeuille, a lawyer with Option consommateurs and main plaintiff in the court filing, claims that since 2015 four companies worked to create a shortage in the beef market, thereby causing an upward movement in the price.

In March 2022, Option consommateurs, along with the Canadian Federation of Independent Business and the Quebec Association of Industrial Electricity Consumers, called on the Quebec government to require the Régie de l'énergie du Québec to freeze Hydro-Québec electricity rates. This follows an announcement by the crown corporation that it would increase rates in 2022 and 2023 in alignment with the rate of inflation. Later, Option consommateurs said that even if the law is modified to limit the increase to 3%, it was launching a petition asking the government to restore the power of the Régie de l'énergie du Québec to set electricity rates annually.

== Funding ==
Option consommateurs has received funding from the Government of Canada's Office of Consumer Affairs for the years 2017 to 2023, and from Centraide of Greater Montreal. It also receives support from Chambre de la sécurité financière, Chambre des notaires du Québec, and the Government of Québec.
