= The Utility Reform Network =

California utility consumer advocacy group

TURN
- Formation: 1972
- Founder: Sylvia Siegel
- Type: Non-profit Organization
- Legal status: Active
- Purpose: Represent utility consumers
- Headquarters: San Francisco
- Website: http://www.turn.org

TURN (The Utility Reform Network) is a consumer advocacy organization headquartered in San Francisco, California. In 1972, Sylvia Siegel started TURN in her kitchen to represent consumers before the California Public Utilities Commission (CPUC), which she felt was overly focused on the interests of its regulated industries at the expense of consumers. Harry Reasoner interviewed Siegel about her work with TURN on CBS's 60 minutes in 1984.

Siegel studied the complex process of setting utility rates, and attracted public attention to a normally dull subject. TURN saved California utility customers billions of dollars.
