= FlyersRights.org =

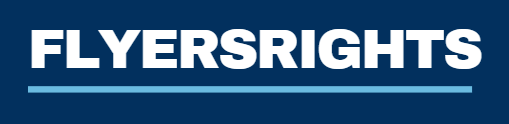
- Predecessor: Coalition for an Airline Passengers Bill of Rights
- Formation: December 29, 2006; 19 years ago
- Founder: Kate Hanni
- Founded at: Austin, Texas, United States
- Type: consumer organization
- Legal status: Nonprofit organization
- Purpose: Airline passenger rights
- Services: Political advocacy
- Members: 40,000
- President: Paul Hudson
- Website: flyersrights.org

FlyersRights.org is a United States–based not-for-profit organization that advocates for the rights and interests of airline passengers. It maintains a staffed office in Washington, D.C. for advocacy before all three branches of the US Federal Government. It operates a toll-free telephone Hotline, an email helpline for individual air travelers and a website with a 'Know Your Rights' online guide. It issues research and policy papers, conducts surveys, sponsors online petitions, maintains an active website and social media presence, provides expert advice on aviation consumer issues to public policy makers and opinion leaders and engages in public education activities.

FlyersRights became nationally known in 2009 after the passing of the Three-Hour Rule. The Department of Transportation supported FlyersRights' mandate, requiring all airlines operating in the United States to deplane passengers if a tarmac delay extends beyond three hours.

It is the biggest non-profit consumer organization in North America representing passengers of commercial airlines.

In 2010, the 24-hour Hotline was launched at 1-877-FLYERS6 (359-3776).

== Legislation ==
In 2011, FlyersRights.org pushed a rule through the U.S. Department Of Transportation, which expanded on passenger protections which became the Airline Passengers' Bill of Rights.

In 2015, FlyersRights.org drafted and filed a petition to the U.S. Congress calling for the Federal Aviation Administration (FAA) to set guidelines for the minimum distance between rows in planes and to appoint a committee to help develop benchmarks. Tens of thousands signed their names to the petition.

In February 2016, Congressman Steve Cohen, (D-TN), introduced an amendment to a FAA funding bill called the Seat Egress in Air Travel which mandated a certain amount of legroom to passengers for safety, health and comfort. It was defeated in the House Transportation Committee.

Two weeks later Senator Charles Schumer (D-NY) also added an amendment to the FAA Reauthorization Bill requiring the agency to set the seat-size guidelines. In April 2016, The Senate voted down the amendment on a 54-to-42 vote, with most Democrats supporting the amendment and most Republicans opposed. This Act was signed into law on October 5, 2018.

January 2019 – FlyersRights.org advocates for reforms to prevent and obtain justice for victims of in-flight sexual assault and harassment.

February 2020 – FlyersRights.org briefs Senate Commerce Committee and House Transportation Committee on helicopter safety following the fatal Kobe Bryant crash.

February 2020 – In Flyersrights Education Fund vs. U.S. Department of Transportation, international change fees are upheld by appeal court.

March 2020 – FlyersRights.org calls for consumer protections and much needed consumer relief be included as a condition of any government bailout to the airlines.

May 2020 – FlyersRights.org endorses legislation by Senators Edward J. Markey (D-Mass.) and Richard Blumenthal (D-Conn.) for nationwide rules to protect the health and safety of the flying public by requiring face masks and social distancing in air travel during Coronavirus pandemic.

June 2020 – FlyersRights.org calls on Congress to protect aviation safety and restore public confidence in aviation safety following the crashes of Lion Air flight JT610 and Ethiopian Airlines flight ET302.

July 2020 – Endorsed Bill to ensure families can safely fly together, children can sit with parents at no additional cost, introduced by Senators Markey, Schumer and Klobuchar.

Dec 2020 – FlyersRights.org court appeal of the FAA ungrounding of the Boeing 737 MAX, based on secret testing and refusal to reveal the technical details of the MAX fix, preventing independent experts to evaluate its safety.

March 2021 – FlyersRights.org unveils Social Distancing and Stimulus Plan to make flights less crowded.

== Litigation ==
FlyersRights partnered with Travelers United to file an amicus curiae brief with the Supreme Court on December 20, 2016, in support of an injured passenger's appeal in Von Schoenebeck v. KLM.

In December 2019, FlyersRights.org sued the FAA for failure to respond to a Freedom of Information Act request for documents related to the FAA's process for evaluating Boeing's proposed fixes to the 737 MAX.

== Aviation safety ==
FlyersRights.org has been critical of the FAA's airplane certification process.

Since 2008, membership on the FAA Aviation Rulemaking Advisory Committee as the designated representative of the traveling public re aviation safety, and membership on the FAA Evacuation Advisory Rulemaking Committee (2019–2020).

In May 2013, in the aftermath of the Boeing 787 grounding due to lithium-ion battery fires, FlyersRights.org, with independent experts, challenged the FAA's preliminary fix as inadequate to prevent future fires or to warn pilots or ground crews of overheating batteries. FlyersRights.org proposed an ETOPS rating of 120 until the FAA could demonstrate the safety of the 787. In 2014, the NTSB would find that the FAA was too reliant on Boeing's assertions of the battery's safety. Meanwhile, Airbus announced it would avoid using Boeing's lithium-ion battery in its planes.

When the FAA Flight Standardization Board recommended iPad training rather than simulator training for pilots of the grounded 737 MAX in April 2019, FlyersRights.org lobbied to extend the public comment period and argued for simulator training. Seven months later, Boeing announced that it would require simulator training for pilots.

FlyersRights.org published a white paper on the 737 MAX's design flaws and the problematic FAA certification process, including Boeing's large role. FlyersRights.org recommended

1. Release of technical details of fix to outside experts for evaluation
2. Suspension of Organization Designation Authorization (ODA)
3. Criminal and civil prosecution of Boeing and its employees who hid or misrepresented dangerous conditions
4. Simulator training for pilots
5. Increased funding of FAA certification and safety oversight
6. Oath of office requirement for industry personnel with delegated authority and whistleblower and other employment protections

== FlyersRights' rulemaking petitions ==
- Mask Rule Petition
- Coronavirus Refund Petition
- Airline Passenger Bill of Rights 2.0
- Petition re Exorbitant Airline Change Fees
- Petition re Shrinking of Airline Seats and Passenger Space
- Petition Reinstating the Reciprocity Rule

== Reports and policy papers ==
FlyersRights Publishes COVID-19 Air Travel Mitigation Policy Memorandum, applauding the Administration's first steps

FlyersRights.org Boeing 737 MAX White Paper.

FlyersRights, Aviation Experts Cast Doubt on Safety of Boeing 737 MAX Ungrounding, ask Court to Order Disclosure of Key Documents and Tests

Ground all helicopters without crashworthy safety features now.

FAA declines to regulate airline seating.

== See also ==
- Flight cancellation and delay
