= Consumers' Association of Ireland =

The Consumers' Association of Ireland Ltd. (CAI) was set up in 1966 to protect and educate consumers. Its first chair was Maude Rooney, who was also instrumental in the establishment of the Association.

== See also ==
- Which?
