= Consumers Council of Canada =

Canadian consumer advocacy organization

- Formation: 1994
- Type: Consumer organization
- Legal status: Active
- Purpose: Consumer advocacy
- Headquarters: Toronto, Ontario, Canada
- Region served: Canada
- Official language: English
- President: Don Mercer
- Website: www.consumerscouncil.com

The Consumers Council of Canada is a non-profit, volunteer-based consumer organization, promoting consumer rights and responsibilities in Canada.

Founded in 1994, the organization is based in Toronto.

The Consumers Council of Canada was a member of the Canadian Consumer Initiative. The initiative, initiated by the Office of Consumer Affairs of Industry Canada, has involved the development common policy positions and sharing of resources by organizations serving consumers in Canada.

== Operating Principles ==
The Consumers Council of Canada advocates for the eight basic consumer rights detailed in the Consumer Bill of Rights, as well as a ninth, the right to privacy, which the council has added. The rights are as follows:

- The right to safety;
- The right to choose;
- The right to be heard;
- The right to be informed;
- The right to consumer education;
- The right to consumer redress;
- The right to a healthy environment;
- The right to basic needs, and;
- The right to privacy.
