= Alliance for Affordable Services =

- Formation: October 2, 1981; 45 years ago
- Type: Consumer organization
- Legal status: Not-for-profit association
- Purpose: Inform and educate members on benefits, services and topics of interest
- Region served: United States
- Members: Private persons
- Website: affordableservices.org

Alliance for Affordable Services, founded in 1981, is a United States national organization that uses group buying power to negotiate discounts on personal, professional, and health care benefits and services for tens of thousands of members. Prior to 2010, it was controlled by HealthMarkets.

== Services ==
Alliance supports an annual scholarship program offering merit-based scholarships to Alliance members and their legal dependents. The scholarship program started in 1996. The Alliance College Guide is an online resource containing information on preparing for college, selecting a campus, the admission process and tuition funding options.

Beginning in 2012, Alliance introduced the Career Education Grant program to provide its members with another option for postsecondary education assistance. Each $1,000 grant awarded through the program is applied toward tuition at an accredited 2-year trade or technical institution or program.

The Alliance Legislative Advocacy Program is designed to inform members, promote legislation supporting small businesses and the self-employed and provide access to tools allowing members to contact their legislators and voice their opinions. In late 2011, Alliance supported legislation for the Small Business Innovation Research Program (SBIR) and the Small Business Technology Transfer Program (STTR) to extend federal technology research funds to small businesses. These programs were passed to provide funding for an additional six years.

Alliance periodically hosts advocacy events around the country, utilizing elected officials to facilitate discussions between elected officials and members, along with small business owners, about issues under debate in Congress. Member surveys also support their advocacy efforts on Capitol Hill. In 2009, an Alliance member survey was used by the Senate Finance Committee to help rank small business incentive ideas.
