= Testachats =

Belgian consumer organization

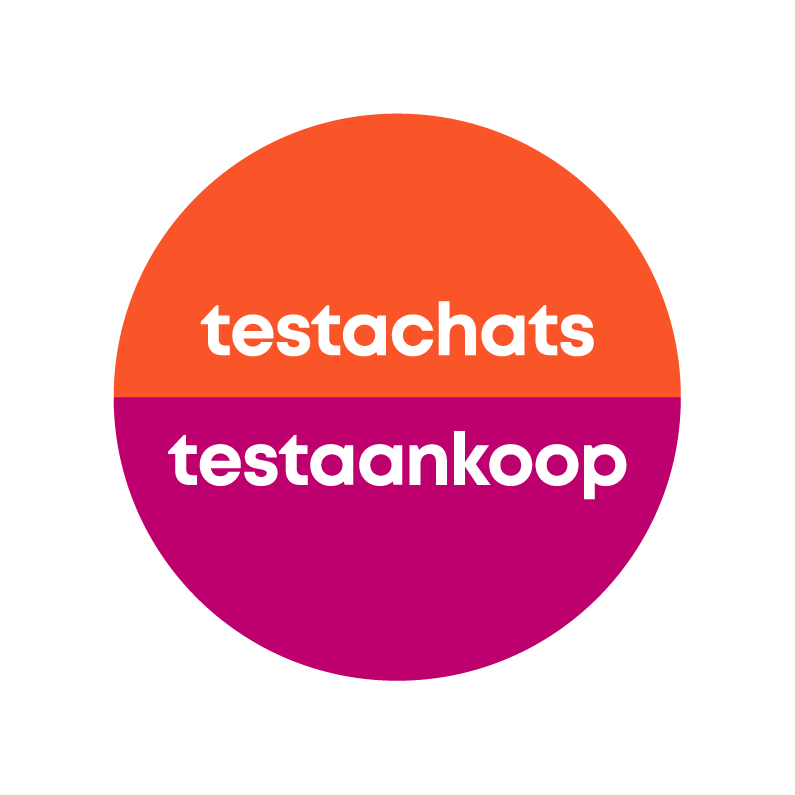
Logo of Testachats / Testaankoop.

Testachats is the French-language consumer brand and Testaankoop is the Dutch-language consumer brand of a Belgian non-profit consumer organization that promotes consumer protection. The organisation was founded in 1957. The two brands serve their respective language audiences through separate websites and publications through a subscription model.

== History ==
The company was founded by Louis Darms in November 1957 as the Association des Consommateurs (French) / Verbruikersunie (Dutch). In 1960 it was one of the founders of the organization now called Consumers International.

Testachats / Testaankoop is a founding member of International Consumer Research & Testing.

In 1987 the company formed partnerships with three other consumer organizations with the intention of coordination comparative product testing in each country. Those organizations are the Comitato Difesa Consumatori (CDC) in Italy, the Organization de Consumidores y Usuarios (OCU) in Spain, and the Associação Portuguesa para a Defesa do Consumidor (DECO) in Portugal.

The organization was a party to a 2011 lawsuit, Testachats vs Council of Ministers, in which it advocated for an end to using gender as a basis for determining insurance rates.

== Bibliography ==
- Van Ryckeghem, Willy (2005). L'histoire de Test-Achats : d'une revue de consommateurs à une multinationale. Brussels: Racine. 221 pp. ISBN 2-87386-404-4.
