= National Association for the Self-Employed =

The National Association for the Self-Employed, based in Washington, D.C., is a trade association that provides day-to-day support for micro-businesses, including direct access to experts, benefits, and consolidated buying power that is traditionally only available to large corporations. The association is the largest nonprofit, nonpartisan association of its kind in the United States.
