= Which? =

British consumer rights brand

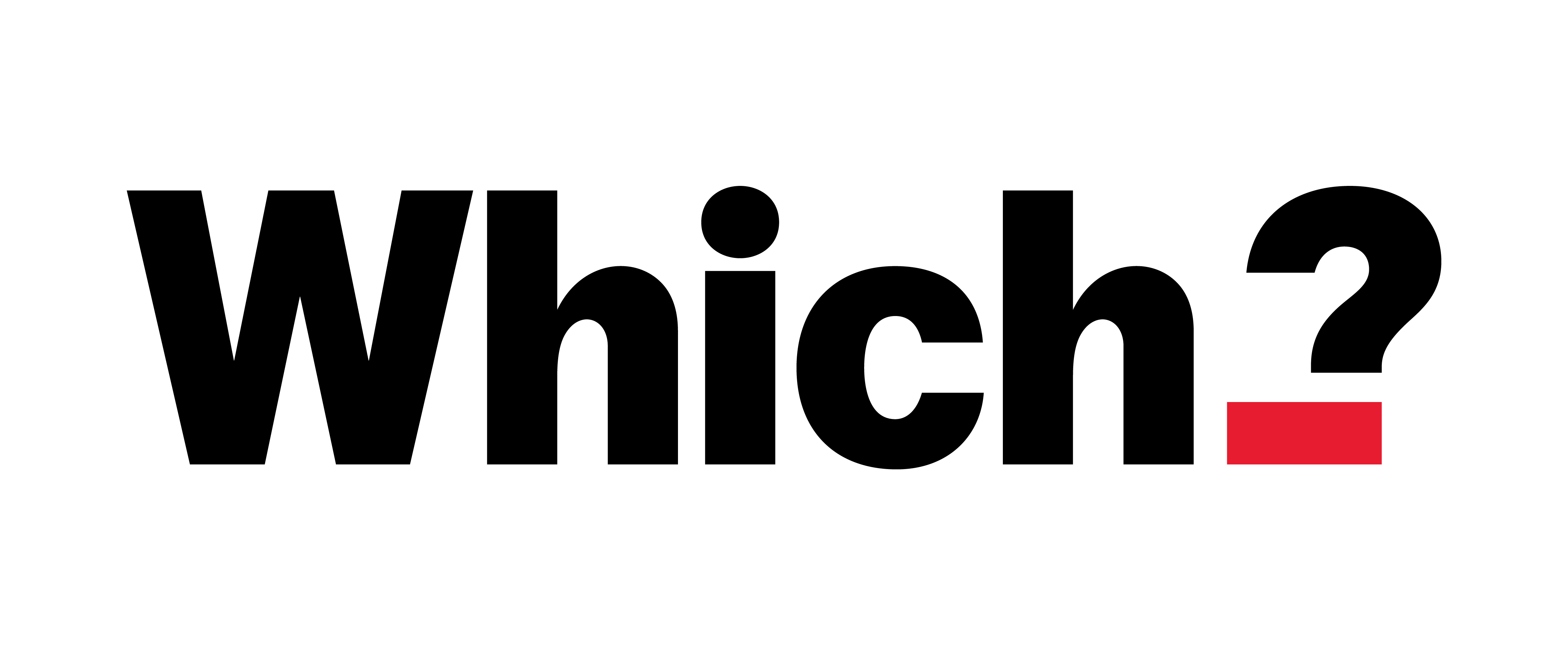

- November 1966 issue
- Categories: Consumer
- Frequency: Monthly
- Publisher: The Consumers' Association
- First issue: October 1957; 68 years ago
- Country: United Kingdom
- Language: English
- Website: which.co.uk

Which? is a United Kingdom brand name that promotes informed consumer choice in the purchase of goods and services by testing products, highlighting inferior products or services, raising awareness of consumer rights, and offering independent advice. The brand name is used by the Consumers' Association, a registered charity and company limited by guarantee that owns several businesses, including Which? Limited, which publishes the Which? magazines, and the currently dormant Which? Financial Services Limited (Which? Mortgage and Insurance Advisers operated until 2019) and Which? Legal Limited.

The vast majority of the association's income comes from the profit it makes on its trading businesses, for instance subscriptions to Which? magazine, which are donated to the campaigning part of the organisation to fund advocacy activity and inform the public about consumer issues. Which? magazine maintains its independence by not accepting advertising, and the organisation receives no government funding. The Consumers' Association is the largest consumer organisation in the UK, with over 500,000 subscribers to its magazine.

Which? also endorses brands and products, including awarding ‘Best Buys’ and ‘Recommended Providers’. These are awarded to brands that achieve a high enough score from reviews by Which?, with the brands then offered the opportunity to purchase the use of the Which? logo on their product's packaging, adverts or other promotional materials.

Until 2006, the association used prize draws similar to those of Reader's Digest to attract subscribers, but following criticism they were discontinued. The Association attracts subscribers to its publications with free mini-guides and trial offers.

== History and background ==
The organisation was set up in 1957 as a response to the changing values and concerns of the post-war era, at a time of rapid changes in product markets and consumer behaviour – and a corresponding growth in sharp trading practices. To combat this, Michael Young, research director for the Labour Party, proposed setting up a 'Consumer Advisory Service' to be considered for the party's 1950 manifesto, only to be rejected by Harold Wilson.

Encouraged by the efforts of Dorothy Bruchholz Goodman, of the United States, and her British husband Raymond J. Goodman, Young continued to push the idea and in October 1957 the first Which? magazine was published from a converted garage in Bethnal Green. Its central aim was to improve the standard of goods and services available to the public in the UK. Under the editorship of Eirlys Roberts, the publication started as a small 32-page magazine that included reports on electric kettles, sunglasses, aspirin, cake-mixes, scouring powders, no-iron cottons and British cars.

By 1959, membership reached 150,000 and a membership services office in Hertford. In 1960, Which? helped to found the International Organisation of Consumer Unions, later Consumers International. In 1962, coverage expanded with the launch of the first quarterly Which? car supplement, which becomes Motoring Which? in 1965, followed by Money Which? in 1968.

In 1970, Which? bought a set of buildings in Harpenden, Hertfordshire, to set up labs to test products including domestic appliances, DIY equipment, and consumer electronics. Previously, the work had been contracted out. The 1970s saw Which? taking a greater campaigning role, and it began to adopt a more aggressive stance on issues such as lead poisoning and aircraft noise. In 1971, for example, Which? published the first league table on the tar and nicotine content of cigarettes. In 1973, Maurice Healy succeeded Eirlys Roberts as editor, and became editor-in-chief for all the Which? magazines, before he left in 1977 to join the National Consumer Council.

The organisation also dabbled in high street consumer advice centres during the 1970s. More than 120 such centres were operating in 1977–78, many of them funded by local councils. The centres closed as funding was withdrawn by the government in 1980.

Which? continued campaigning on consumer safety issues, with its car safety test results strengthening calls to legislate car manufacturers to fit seat belts in all new cars, helping to make it compulsory to Clunk Click Every Trip in 1983. In 1992, Which? launched another satellite publication, this one aimed at youngsters aged 11–15, called Check It Out!, but it failed to take off and closed in June 1994. In 1995, testing facilities were moved to Milton Keynes where they remained until 2002, when the majority of the Which? testing activities were contracted out. Which? Online, the first incarnation of the Which? website, was launched in 1996 which incorporated its own ISP, email and content in addition to the Which Online Forum - an area accessible to members which offered unfettered access to members of the senior management within Which? including the Directors.

The trading organisation was rebranded as Which? in 2004 and this is the brand promoted to the general public. However the charity the Consumers' Association continues to own Which? Limited and retains its own name.

Following the deregulation of the gas and electricity industry, Which? launched a free online energy comparison service called Switch with Which? in 2005, to compare energy tariffs. The service was awarded Energywatch Confidence Code accreditation in 2006.

As a predominantly print media publication, Which? has also seen declining print sales and subscriber numbers in the 21st century. To offset this, Which? has expanded its online presence both in terms of paywalled website content and freely accessible newsletters as a tool to reach new audiences. Which? also partners with trusted providers such as Octopus Energy in order to offer exclusive deals to subscribers.

Which? also increased its campaigning, successfully advocating for auto-compensation for consumers who receive poor broadband speeds, an independent Rail Ombudsman, fines for nuisance calls, and protecting free ATMs.

In December 2023, Press Gazette ranked Which? 18th in their list of the world’s most subscribed to paywalled news publications.

== Product testing ==
Which? carries out systematic testing of consumer products and financial services, the results of which are published in reports in Which? magazine and on the Which? website and app. Tests are carried out on goods, services, and suppliers. Testing covers reliability, performance, safety, energy efficiency and value-for-money, as relevant in different cases. Top-rated products are awarded the Which? 'Best Buy' status logo, an accreditation recognised by industry and consumers. Which? first used the phrase in its second magazine edition in 1958, to describe Boots 365 talcum powder. Conversely, the worst-performing products are labelled 'Don't Buys'. Which? also awards ‘Great Value’ endorsements for highly rated cheaper choices and ‘Eco Buys’ for products that have the least environmental impact.

Which? Awards
The Which? Awards is an annual event to "celebrate reward the very best businesses in the UK". Award winners are selected by Which? staff, based on test findings and feedback from Which? members throughout the year.

Unusual test subjects
As well as the usual household products, Which? has tested things such as:

- Bird seed for budgerigars in 1959
- Contraceptives in 1963
- Paper dresses in 1967
- Pets in 1977

== Publications ==
Most Which? publications are supplied only to subscribers, and are not on general sale. Which? magazine, started in 1957, is the organisation's principal publication. The magazine reports on consumer issues of the day, publishes product testing results and findings of original research and investigations.

The magazine also discusses trading which it believes goes against the interests of consumers. Examples of such discussions include an exposé into solar panel heating installation companies, an undercover enquiry with the RNID revealing serious problems at shops selling hearing aids and an investigation into electronics shop staffs' knowledge of the products that they sell.

Other publications include Which? Travel, Which? Car, Which? Money, Which? Tech (previously Which? Computing) and Which? Gardening.

== Commercial ==
Which? has diversified its income by expanding its commercial operations, reporting in 2024 that this generated £21m in non-subscription revenue. Which? states that all of its commercial activity supports its charitable activities.

Brands that have been tested and awarded endorsements such as ‘Best Buy’, ‘Recommended Provider’, ‘Great Value’, ‘Eco Buy’, and ‘Cheapest Supermarket’ are offered the opportunity to purchase the license, including the Which? logo, to use on marketing and packaging. In the financial year ending July 2024, 204 brands had purchased these endorsements.

Which? launched its Trusted Trader scheme in 2013, offering tradespeople the opportunity to purchase the licence to use the Which? Trusted Traders logo and appear on the Which? Trusted Trades database if they pass an assessment including examinations of financial health; business, administrative and DBS checks, and customer references. The Which? Trusted Trader scheme has worked with councils, such as Islington Council, to create local reputable tradespeople schemes.

== Finances ==
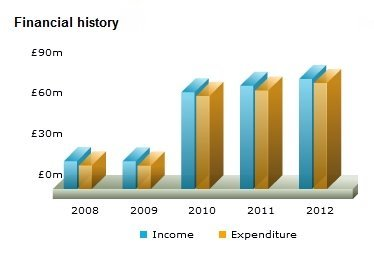
Consumers' Association financial history five years to 30 June 2012

The Consumers' Association experienced sharply increased income up to 2014, and since then has shown steady figures.

Which? Limited’s 2025 end of year financial statement reported turnover of £83,665,000, resulting in a profit of £7,015,000.

== Lobbying activities ==
Which? regularly briefs and lobbies MPs, Peers, MSPs, MSs, and MLAs on national and international consumer issues. Notably, Which? successfully lobbied to put an end to the '65-day rule' that allowed energy companies to wait 65 days before informing their customers of a price change.

Following the creation of the Scottish parliament in 1999, in January 2002 Which? established an office in Edinburgh. Which? also works with the European Consumers' Association (BEUC), which brings together over 40 consumer organisations from across Europe to represent common consumer interests within the EU institutions.

Included among the campaign successes Which? lists are:

- 1964 lead free paint in toys and safer electric blankets.
- 1978 Unfair Contract Terms Act.
- 1982 food and drugs (amendment) bill and the supply of goods and services bill.
- 1983 wearing seatbelts in front seats of cars becomes compulsory.
- 2008 supported the formation of the Future of Banking Commission.
- 2018 creating an independent Rail Ombudsman.
- 2019 introducing fines for nuisance calls.
- 2023 Ofcom ban on unpredictable mid-contract price rises.

== Campaigns ==
As well as political lobbying activities, Which? campaigns for changes of practice within industries or individual companies. An early notable victory was the campaign in 1985 for Toyota to recall the Space Cruiser. In the 21st century, Which? successfully campaigned against banks introducing fees for using cash machines in 2000, for automatic compensation for poor broadband speeds in 2017, and for Whirlpool to recall over 500,000 washing machines in 2019, including advocating for refunds for recalled units.

== Legal powers ==
=== Super-complaints ===
The Consumers' Association has the power under The Enterprise Act 2002 to take action on behalf of consumers, including the ability to bring a super-complaint to the Financial Conduct Authority (FCA). Which? is one of five organisations able to issue a super-complaint. The Consumers' Association was among the first groups granted these new powers, and was among the first to have them regranted when the Office of Fair Trading (OFT) was replaced by the FCA. A super-complaint can be made about any market that is not working properly for consumers. As consumers are not in the position to overcome the issue themselves, Which? can issue a super-complaint on consumers' behalf. The FCA has 90 days in which to assess the complaint and decide what to do about it. It can reject the complaint in part or as a whole, it can launch a market investigation, take action under competition law or consumer law, or refer the market to the Competition and Markets Authority for further investigation.

Which? made its first super-complaint about private dentistry in 2001. It later made complaints about care homes, the Northern Ireland banking sector and credit card interest calculation methods. In March 2011, it made a super-complaint about unfair debit and credit card payment surcharges made by retailers. The OFT upheld the super-complaint in June 2011.

In September 2016, Which? filed a super-complaint against banks that routinely refused to reimburse victims who had been scammed into transferring money into fraudsters' accounts. Which? said banks should "shoulder more responsibility" for such fraud, much as they already reimburse customers who lose money through scams involving fraudulent account activity, or debit or credit cards. According to official industry data, such scams increased by 53% in a year: from 660,308 cases in the first half of 2015 to 1,007,094 in the first half of 2016. Which? said: "Consumers can only protect themselves so far. People cannot be expected to detect complex scams pressuring them to transfer money immediately, or lookalike bills from their solicitor or builder" that are copied from genuine bills but have had the bank account number and sort code changed.

On September 23, 2025, Which? submitted a formal super-complaint to the Financial Conduct Authority, alleging systemic failures in the UK home and travel insurance markets. Which? claimed that "widespread failings" in claims handling and flawed sales processes were significantly harming consumers. Which? specifically highlighted low claims acceptance rates, cited as 72% for buildings and contents combined claims and 81% for travel, compared to 99% in the motor sector, and criticized the industry's reliance on outsourced third-party handlers. In its formal response on December 18, 2025, the FCA committed to an expanded 2026 workplan focusing on customer service standards and sales transparency. The regulator also disclosed it had already initiated enforcement actions against several firms, including two formal cases and business restrictions, as part of a broader "regulatory reset" for the sector.

=== Legal action against rogue traders ===
In 2005, Which? was granted legal powers to bring rogue traders to account for their actions under Part 8 of the Enterprise Act 2002.

=== Unfair contract terms ===
Which? has statutory powers under the Unfair Terms in Consumer Contracts Regulations 1999, where they can seek an injunction to restrain the use of an unfair contract term by a trader against consumers.

=== Competition Appeals Tribunal ===
Which? is one of the 'specified bodies' who, under the Enterprise and Competition Acts, may bring proceedings before the Competition Appeals Tribunal (CAT) on behalf of two or more consumers for damages. Which? was granted specified body status on 1 October 2005 by the Ministers of the Department of Trade and Industry. In April 2007, Which? launched its first representative action on behalf of consumers unlawfully overcharged for football shirts due to price fixing.

== Organisational structure ==
The Consumers' Association owns an operational company Which? Ltd who report to the Council of Trustees. The Board of Which? Ltd is made up primarily of co-opted members, members of Which? staff and some representatives from the Consumers' Association Council.

The Consumers' Association is subject to both the Companies Act 2006 and to charity requirements. Since 2012, it is governed by a Council of nine elected and up-to six co-opted members who can serve a maximum of nine years at any one time.

Only Ordinary members of the Consumers' Association can stand for the council. Any subscriber can become a member of the Consumers' Association by agreeing to guarantee the debts of the Association to a maximum of 50p. It also means they will receive Annual Accounts, AGM Minutes, and be able to vote on Resolutions that change the governing Articles.

Council trustees do not receive any payment for their service, however non-executive directors on the Which? board are remunerated. Sam Younger became Chairman on 1 January 2020, replacing Tim Gardam who had held the role since 2015.

== Traffic ==
As of November 2024, Press Gazette ranked the Which? website 25th in the UK for page views, with 32.6m views per month.

== Associated organisations ==
Which? is a member of Consumers International, the international membership organisation comprising 250 consumer groups around the world. Which? was a founding member of the International Organisation of Consumers Unions, which would later become Consumers International.

Members of Consumers International include:

- CHOICE (Australia)
- Consumer Council of Canada (Canada)
- Verbraucherzentrale (Germany)
- Consumers Union of Japan (Japan)
- Consumentenbond (Netherlands)
- Consumer Reports (USA)
