= UFC-Que Choisir =

French consumer advocacy organization

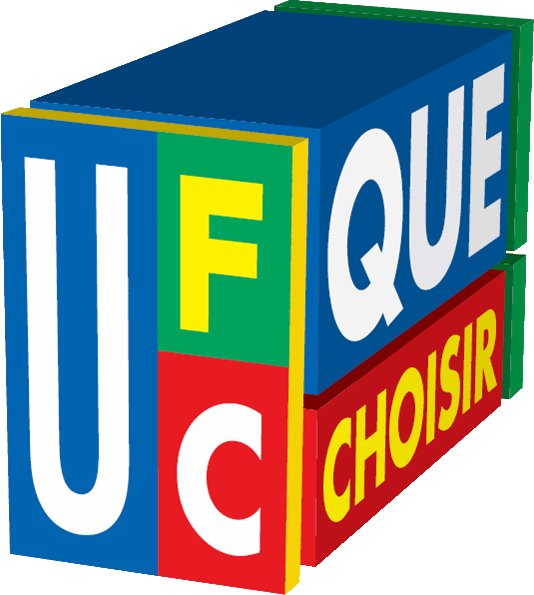
- Formation: 1951
- Purpose: Consumer movement
- Headquarters: 233, Boulevard Voltaire, Paris 11e
- Region served: France
- Official language: French
- Key people: Alain Bazot (president)
- Website: quechoisir.org

UFC-Que Choisir is a French consumers group with 160 domestic local groups.

UFC-Que Choisir defends the rights of consumers in litigation against corporations, and pushes for public policies reinforcing the rights of consumers.

It publishes a magazine called Que Choisir ("What to Choose").

== Data privacy ==
It filed a lawsuit in France's Tribunal de Grande Instance against Facebook, Google, and Twitter for "abusive" and "illegal" practices regarding data privacy and their failure to modify their privacy policies and terms of service despite repeated warnings and months of negotiations. They faulted the terms of services for being "incomprehensible, illegible, filled with hyperlinks...and sometimes referring to pages in English". Their statement accused the companies of shirking responsibility: "If the social media networks are particularly greedy in terms of data, they are dieting when it comes to responsibility".
