= Consumer Action =

Nonprofit organization

- Formation: 1971
- Location: San Francisco, Los Angeles, Washington, DC, OR, United States;
- Exec. Dir.: Anna Flores
- Website: www.consumer-action.org

Consumer Action is a nonprofit, consumer education and advocacy center, serving consumers in the United States. Founded in 1971, Consumer Action, as a 510(c)(3) nonprofit organization.

It has offices in San Francisco, Washington, D.C., and Los Angeles.

== Overview ==
Consumer Action's frequent focus is consumer credit—and the related areas of credit cards, banking and finance, money management, and pricing; as well as health, housing, scams, fraud, privacy, and more. Consumer Action is known for its annual Credit Card Survey.

Consumer Action works in collaboration with numerous consumer protection, consumer advocacy organizations, and coalitions to file commentary on government legislation and briefs, such as Fair and Reasonable Fee for Credit Score Disclosure and for the publication of education and informational resources, such as Consumer Privacy Guide published jointly with: the Center for Democracy & Technology, Common Cause, the National Consumers League, and the Privacy Rights Clearinghouse.

Consumer Action is a consumer protection, education, and advocacy organization, as quantified by the Urban Institute's National Center for Charitable Statistics. It is often cited in consumer education campaigns and interviews, like ABC's the View from the Bay.

== Credit Card Survey ==
In June 1986, in collaboration with the Consumer Federation, Consumer Action introduced the Consumer Action Credit Card Survey, an annual survey of credit cards, banks, and lending practices. The survey has become well known for highlighting hidden practices of credit card vendors that are anti-consumer.

The annual survey has highlighted predatory lending practices; and has been used to gain the attention of lawmakers. Don Oldenburg, of The Washington Post sites the highlighting of questionable lending and payment practices as one of the resources used for Congress and federal bank regulators to these questionable and costly practices.

Congress, a House bill called "The Consumer Credit Card Protection Act" would prohibit arbitrary universal default penalties. Another bill, "The Loan Shark Prevention Act," would establish a fair cap on credit card interest rates.

The survey has been quoted and used local and national sources, such as Smart Money, CNN Money, and The New York Times.

== See also ==
- Consumer Federation of America
