= Japan Offspring Fund =

Japan Offspring Fund was established in 1984 and is registered as a Non-Political Organization (NPO). JOF activities include testing the safety of food and campaigning about safety issues regarding “living”, a broad concept based on the Japanese word kurashi. In 2007, JOF moved to a new office in an eco-building in Yono, Saitama, Japan.

- Junichi Kowaka

The Japanese name, Shokuhin to Kurashi no Anzen Kikin literally means “Fund for Safe Food and Living”. Financial support for activities comes from members fees (including a subscription to the monthly magazine “Safety of Our Food and Life”) as well as from sales of other publications. Starting in 2004, JOF is also publishing “Anzen Style” to promote safe and healthy products around Japan.

Major campaign areas:

- Food additives
- Post harvest pesticides
- International food standards (Codex Alimentarius)
- Genetically modified organisms/GM Foods
- Electromagnetic waves
- Nuclear power
- Air/water/soil contamination
- Antibiotic resistance
- Hormone disrupting substances
- dioxins
- PCBs

International activities:

Since 1999, Japan Offspring Fund has participated at the international level at FAO/WHO Codex Alimentarius conferences regarding food safety standards. JOF has represented consumers also at other international meetings, including the World Trade Organization, OECD and UNEP/CBD. Reporting from such meetings in the monthly magazine is one way to empowering consumers and increasing awareness about the effects of globalization.

JOF's international food work is done as a member of IACFO, in cooperation with Center for Science in the Public Interest and The Food Commission. Other work, for example on PCB pollution and hormone disrupting substances, has been done together with consumer and environmental organizations in Korea, China, Malaysia, and other Asian countries.
