= Consumentenbond =

Dutch non-profit organization which promotes consumer protection

Logo

The Consumentenbond (CB, "Consumers association") is a Dutch non-profit organization that promotes consumer protection.

== History ==
The Consumentenbond was established in 1953. As of 1997, it had 650,000 members and represented one out of nine Dutch families, which made it the consumer organization with the highest level of penetration in any nation. Just as other membership-based organisations, the number of members has declined significantly since the beginning of this century. For the last five years the membership count stabilized on or around 480,000 members. The name of the Consumentenbond is sometimes shortened as "CB".

In 1960, the Consumentenbond was one of the five founders of what is now called Consumers International. Until 1993, the headquarters of the organization was hosted in The Hague. The Consumentenbond has, with Consumers International, emphasized the need to assist consumers in developing countries.

In 1962, the Consumentenbond participated in the foundation of the European Consumers' Bureau (BEUC).

In 1970, the Consumentenbond along with representatives of commercial industries established the Foundation for Resolution of Disputes (SGC), which was an organization which had the mission to address consumer complaints for member companies in those industries. Whenever a consumer had a complaint, it would be heard by a panel consisting of a chairman with legal expertise, a representative of the industry, and a representative selected by Consumentenbond.

In 1974, the Consumentenbond and Konsumenten Kontakt (another Dutch consumer organisation) used government funding to establish the Foundation for Scientific Research on Consumer Affairs (SWOKA) to guide government policy.
