= Consumers' Checkbook =

- Consumers' CHECKBOOK cover Fall 2011/ Winter 2012 Issue
- Executive Editor: Kevin Brasler
- Categories: Consumer advocacy
- Frequency: Semiannually
- Publisher: Center for the Study of Services
- Founder: Robert Krughoff
- Founded: 1974
- First issue: 1976
- Country: United States
- Based in: Washington, D.C.
- Language: English
- Website: checkbook.org

Consumers' Checkbook/Center for the Study of Services (doing business as Consumers’ CHECKBOOK) is an independent, nonprofit consumer organization. It was founded in 1974 in order to provide survey information to consumers about vendors and service providers. There are both print and online publications in the Boston, Chicago, Delaware Valley, Puget Sound, San Francisco/Oakland/San Jose, Twin Cities, and Washington, D.C., areas. Currently most of the Center's income comes from doing contract surveys for major health plans.

== Company overview ==
Consumers' Checkbook and Center for the Study of Services were founded by company President Robert Krughoff after he had a bad auto repair experience. In response, he founded the publication as a not-for-profit venue for rating professionals in fields including mechanics and plumbers. The publication eventually began reviewing other professions and services, like physicians. As part of its intention to provide unbiased information, the publication does not carry advertising, but does charge a subscription fee.

The first issue of Consumers' Checkbook came out in 1974. The ratings are based on surveys of consumers, reports from undercover shoppers, expert surveys, the number of consumer agency complaints against a company or service provider, and an analysis of publicly available databases. The first publication only covered the Washington, D.C. area. In 1982, its first magazine for another city began, focusing on the San Francisco Bay Area. In 2003, the company expanded to include publications for Seattle-Tacoma, the Twin Cities, Chicago, the Philadelphia metropolitan area, and Boston.

The formal name of the organization is Center for the Study of Services. As of 2018, $9 million of their budget is for customer surveys paid for by over 250 HMO and PPO health plans and Medicare Advantage and Drug plans. Results are published by Medicare, Office of Personnel Management, U.S. News & World Report, and other sources. $3 million of the budget is for evaluating local businesses in seven metropolitan areas, paid for by public subscriptions, and published by Checkbook.

== Resources ==
Consumers' Checkbook publishes an annual Guide to Health Plans for Federal Employees, a health insurance plan cost and quality comparison resource, first publishing the work in 1979. The book is published in paper form, and in 2000 its contents were moved online to GuideToHealthPlans.org. Between 1985 and 2004 the company published Bargains, a publication that focused on price comparisons between retailers in both Washington DC and San Francisco. Between 1988 and 1998, they also published DC and San Francisco versions of a Checkbook Guide to Area Restaurants. In 1994 they began publishing the Consumer's Guide to Health Plans. The company also publishes the Consumers’ Guide to Top Doctors, providing a list of recommended specialists in the 53 largest metro areas of the U.S. as well as the Consumers' Guide to Hospitals, providing ratings for about 4,500 U.S. acute-care hospitals, which it first published in 1988. The Guide to Top Doctors was first published in 1999.

The company also runs the website SurgeonRatings.org. Between 2007 and 2009, the company published “a demonstration project surveying patients about their experience of care with their doctors using the Clinician/Group CAHPS Survey instrument developed by the US Agency for Health Care Research and Quality,” according to Robert Mayer. Checkbook founded Patient Central in 2009, which ranks doctors in Denver-Boulder, Memphis, Kansas City, and New York (Manhattan). It also releases industry specific and city specific surveys of price differences, such as the differences between grocery stores. Checkbook also created the MNsure price comparison site.

== Medicare claims data and lawsuit ==
In 2006, under the Freedom of Information Act, Consumers' Checkbook sued the United States Department of Health and Human Services for records of claims filed by physicians under Medicare. Checkbook intended to use these claims to report the volume of experience each doctor had with various high-risk procedures. HHS held the belief that the release of such data enabled the user to identify individual physicians, and therefore was prohibited from doing so. Checkbook won the case in the Federal District Court, but the ruling was reversed in the Court of Appeals and the Supreme Court declined to take the case. The data was ultimately released in 2014 and has been published by Checkbook and ProPublica.

== Car Bargains ==
Since 1990, Consumers' Checkbook has also operated the car-buying and -leasing services, CarBargains and LeaseWise. The service pursues bids on the selected car model from five local dealers, asking them to compete against one another. That same year Checkbook began publishing the biannual publications CarDeals, a newsletter comparing car prices and financing options.

The CarBargains and LeaseWise services were discontinued on September 15, 2023.

== Recognition ==
Checkbook has won the National Press Club's First Place Award for Excellence in Consumer Journalism, and in 2000 was honored, with the Esther Peterson Consumer Service Award. The company has also received first place in the Robert Wood Johnson Foundation Plan Choice Challenge.
