= Consumer Watchdog (Botswana) =

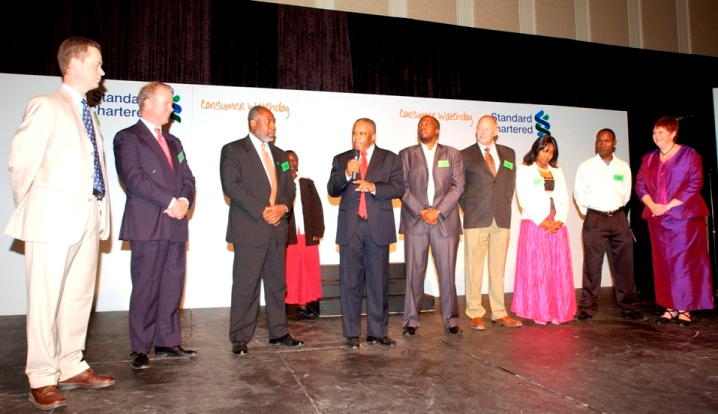
President Festus Mogae at the 2007 Consumer Watchdog Party

Consumer Watchdog is a division of Business & Enterprise Solutions Botswana (Pty) Ltd, a privately owned company registered in Botswana and based in Gaborone.

With a weekly newspaper column in the country's best-selling newspaper The Voice, as well as a blog, and a Facebook groupof over 200,000 members Consumer Watchdog has a wide reach regarding consumer issues in Botswana.

Originally set up in 2004, Consumer Watchdog has the following stated aims:

- To campaign for legislation to protect the consumer
- To represent consumers and advocate on their behalf
- To make service providers in Botswana accountable
- To educate consumers about their choices, their rights, their responsibilities

Services delivered by BES, the parent company of Consumer Watchdog, include customer service training, organisational review and mystery shopping.

On 31 May 2007, Consumer Watchdog celebrated its second birthday party, with the President of Botswana Festus Mogae as guest of honour. 180 customer service champions were celebrated in front of the president, the press and the people.

Consumer Watchdog representatives have worked widely with companies in Botswana and southern Africa, including major banks in Botswana. They also work with the government, insurance companies, retail outlets and restaurants.
