= Funeral Consumers Alliance =

Funeral Consumers Alliance, based in South Burlington, Vermont is a nonprofit educational consumer organization, founded in 1963. The alliance works to protect the consumer's right to choose a meaningful, dignified, and affordable funeral. The organization is run solely through volunteers.

Funeral Consumers Alliance operates in the United States and Canada.The organizations oldest and founding member is the Seattle-based People's Memorial Association, founded on January 12, 1939.
