= ANEC (organisation) =

Specialist consumer organisation in Europe

The European consumer voice in standardisation
- Abbreviation: ANEC
- Formation: 1995
- Type: Regional consumer organisation
- Registration no.: Belgian enterprise no. 0457696181; EU Transparency register no. 507800799-30
- Legal status: non-profit organisation (AISBL)
- Purpose: Raising standards for European consumers
- Headquarters: Rue d'Arlon 80
- Location: Brussels 1040
- Region served: Europe
- Fields: standardization
- Members: 29 states: Austria; Belgium; Bulgaria; Cyprus; Czechia; Denmark; Estonia; Finland; France; Germany; Greece; Iceland; Ireland; Italy; Latvia; Lithuania; North Macedonia; Malta; Norway; Poland; Portugal; Romania; Serbia; Slovenia; Spain; Sweden; The Netherlands; Turkey; United Kingdom
- President: Dermott Jewell
- Director-General: Stephen Russell
- Main organ: ANEC Secretariat
- Affiliations: European Union, EFTA
- Website: www.anec.eu

ANEC, formally The European consumer voice in standardisation (prior to June 2022, The European Association for the Coordination of Consumer Representation in Standardisation), is an organisation promoting and defending the collective European consumer interest in the process of standardization, and in related fields such as conformity assessment (e.g.certification), market surveillance and enforcement. ANEC also aims to influence legislation that makes reference to standards or standardization. In November 2008, ANEC adopted the strapline 'Raising Standards for Consumers' as part of an initiative to improve the visibility of the association. On 15 March 2018, World Consumer Rights' Day, ANEC launched a short video (2 minutes 15 seconds) to explain its role and highlight some of its successes.

ANEC provides technical expertise and advice drawn from a network of consumer representatives across Europe. In 2022, the association's 185 experts contributed to the work of 237 technical committees and working groups of the European Standardization Organisations, CEN, CENELEC and ETSI and international standards organisations, ISO and IEC, participating in 579 meetings and contributing 456 sets of comments on draft standards.

On 15 June 2022, an Extraordinary General Meeting of the association adopted new Statutes. The most visible modifications introduced by the Statutes were the change in the legal title of the association, and the change in the title of the lead executive from Secretary-General to Director-General.

== History ==
ANEC was set up in 1995 as an international non-profit association under Belgian law. Its principal motivation was to ensure organised consumer participation in the development of European Standards intended to support European legislation introduced under the New Approach to Technical Harmonization and Standardization. However, its competence also extends to other European Standards developed by the European Standardization Organisations, as well as to other standards that may impact directly or indirectly on the European consumer (for example, certain standards of W3C, the World Wide Web Consortium).

== Organisation ==
ANEC is open to the representation of consumer organisations from the 27 European Union Member States and the United Kingdom, three European Free Trade Association (EFTA) countries (Iceland, Norway and Switzerland) as well as North Macedonia, Serbia and Turkey. The organisation's General Assembly is composed of one national member per country, nominated jointly by the national consumer organisations in that country. Its Working Groups bring together experts from the countries of its members who define the consensual positions on behalf of the collective European consumer interest in fields related presently to seven areas of priority (Accessibility, Child Safety, Digital Society, Domestic Appliances, Services, Sustainability, and Traffic & Mobility). These areas of priority respond to the needs voiced through the General Assembly by the national consumer organisations. ANEC reimburses the travel, accommodation and subsistence costs of its volunteers, and pays a daily allowance.

Regarding services, ANEC is primarily concerned with the safety of services, rather than their quality which is of secondary concern. It does not strive to eliminate all diversity in services, but rather demands that certain core safety requirements need to be complied with by providers to ensure all customers' wellbeing through standardisation. Nevertheless, it believes a horizontal legislative framework for the safety of services is needed, in other words, an extension of the "New Approach" to services.

Van Leeuwen (2017) claims that ANEC lacks the human resources and technical expertise to play a major role in the process of European standardisation, and is able to obtain achievements on only a limited number of consumer protection issues. ANEC confirms that the 'national delegation principle' means it "does not have a central role in the European Standardisation System". However, it notes its achievements do include "a few big wins", and highlights a number of them (such as ensuring the safe use of "100s of millions" of domestic electrical appliances by vulnerable consumers, and safe sound limits by default in Personal Music Players) but stresses they are not limited to these "high-profile successes".

ANEC is funded by the European Union (95%) and EFTA (5%) for its core mission under Regulation (EU) 1025/2012, while the time of the representatives of the national consumer organisations and experts is accepted by the EU and EFTA as a "contribution in kind". In 2020, the grant made available to ANEC was 1.44 million euros. The ANEC secretariat calculated the "contribution in kind" in 2007 to be worth 260.000 euros. The contribution was calculated to be worth 516.000 euros in 2020, and 620.000 euros in 2022.

The ANEC secretariat is based in Brussels. In October 2020, the secretariat relocated to rue d'Arlon 80, the same premises as The European Consumer Organisation (BEUC). The secretariat team is responsible for leading the political activities of the association. ANEC has signed the European Union's Transparency Register (with identification number 507800799-30) and accepted its code of conduct.

On 15 June 2023, Dermott Jewell (Ireland) was re-elected ANEC president for the term 2023 to 2027. Rusnė Juozapaitienė (Lithuania) was elected vice-president, and Olav Kasland (Norway) was elected treasurer. In December 2025, Jens Henriksson (Sweden) succeeded Rusnė Juozapaitienė as vice-president. The director-general is Stephen Russell.

== See also ==
- European Committee for Standardization (CEN)
- The European Consumer Organisation (BEUC)
