= Consumers International =

International umbrella organisation for consumer protection

- Founded: 1960
- Type: Charity No. 1122155
- Purpose: Consumer protection watchdog
- Location(s): London, N5; United Kingdom
- Origins: Formerly the International Organisation of Consumers Unions
- Region served: Global
- Method: Campaigning
- Members: 250
- Website: www.consumersinternational.org

Consumers International is the membership organization for consumer groups around the world. Founded on 1 April 1960, it has over 250 member organizations in 120 countries. Its head office is situated in London, England, and has numerous regional offices in Latin America, Asia Pacific, Middle East and Africa.

Consumers International is a not-for-profit company limited by guarantee.

== History ==
The organization was first established in the year 1960 as the International organization of Consumers Unions (IOCU) by National consumer organizations who wanted to create cross-border campaigns and share knowledge.

IOCU was founded by Elizabeth Schadee, who would later chair the board of the Netherlands' Consumentenbond, and Caspar Brook, who was the first director of the United Kingdom's Consumers' Association. The two proposed an international conference to plan for consumer product testing organizations worldwide to work more closely together. The United States organization Consumers Union provided US$10,000 at the request of Colston Warne to help fund the event.

In January 1960, these three organizations sponsored the First International Conference on Consumer Testing in The Hague. Thirty-four people representing seventeen consumer organizations in fourteen countries attended to discuss product testing and founding the International organization of Consumers Unions as an international organization. Belgium's Association des Consommateurs and the Australian Consumers' Association joined the three conference sponsors as the five founding organizations who became the international organization's initial council. In 1979, IOCU (which then became Consumers International) and other citizens' groups formed the International Baby Food Action Network (IBFAN) to eradicate the death and disease affecting millions of babies in economically developing countries as a result of consuming bottle-fed formula milk. After intense campaigning by IBFAN, including organizing consumer boycotts against the likes of Nestlé, whose subtle yet effective campaigns were undermining breastfeeding, the World Health Assembly of the World Health Organization, adopted the International Code of Marketing on Breast Milk Substitutes the first such code designed to control widespread marketing abuses by baby food companies.

In 1981, Consumers International co-founded the Health Action International (HAI), an informal network of some 120 consumer and public interest groups, HAI engaged in worldwide campaigns for the safe, rational and economic use of pharmaceuticals. At the 41st World Health Assembly in 1987, HAI organised a large lobby of delegates to urge stronger controls on advertising by the drugs industry.

== Membership ==
Consumers International has over 250 member organizations in 120 countries. These members are independent consumer organizations.

About two-thirds of member organizations are in economically developing countries, the other third in industrialised countries.

Consumers International also works with and hosts the Transatlantic Consumer Dialogue (TACD) a forum of US and EU consumer organizations that develops and agrees on consumer policy recommendations to the US government and European Union to promote the consumer interest in EU and US policy making – at its office in London.

== World Consumer Rights Day ==
On 15 March 1962 former US President John F. Kennedy with Consumer Bill of Rights said:

Consumers by definition include us all. They are the largest economic group, affecting and affected by almost every public and private economic decision. Yet they are the only important group… whose views are often not heard.

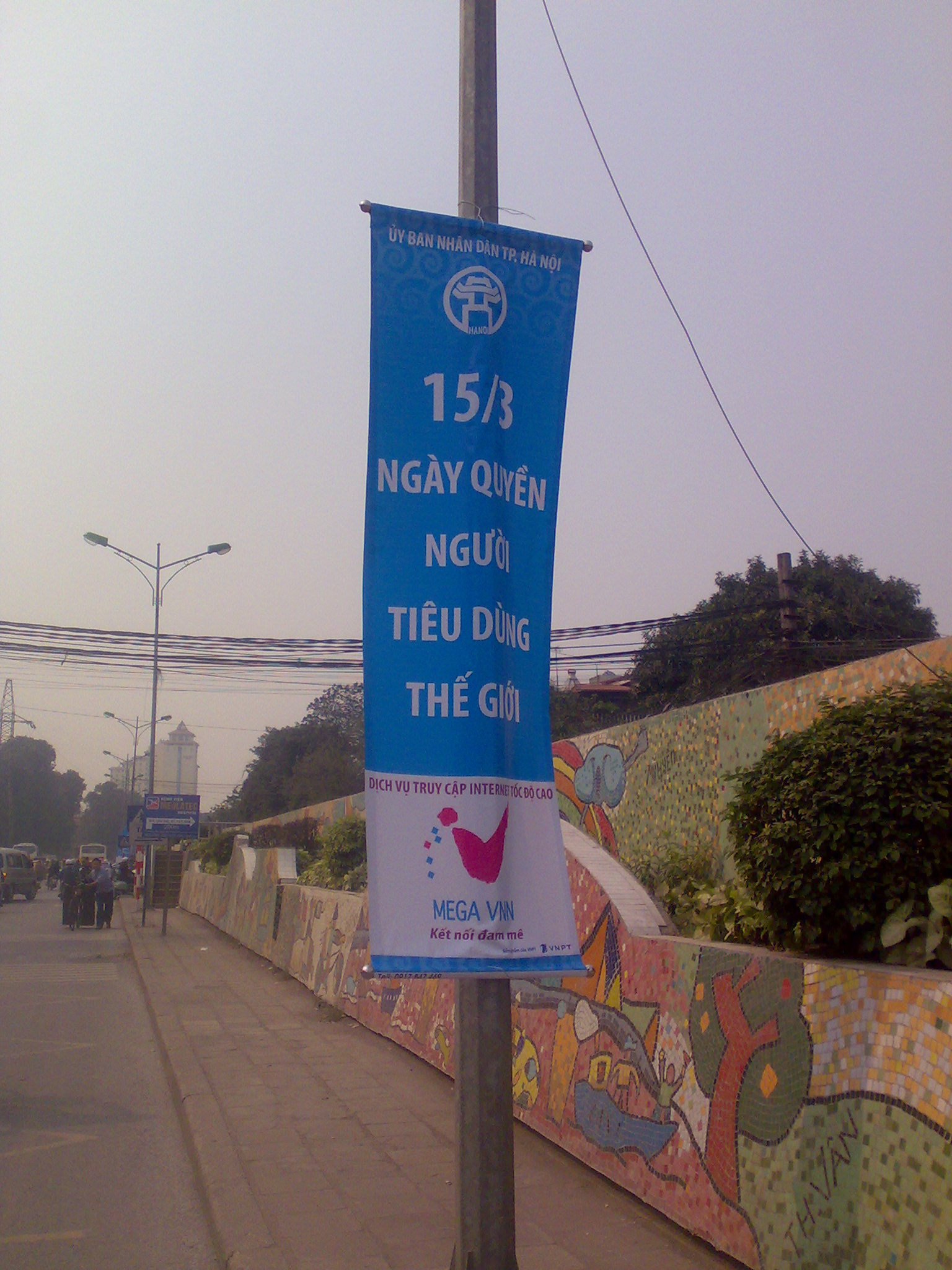
WCRD's poster at Hanoi

First two chapters of Access to Knowledge for Consumers, a book from the Access to Knowledge campaign of Consumers International

Consumer rights activist Anwar Fazal working for Consumers International at the time, later proposed the observance of a 'World Consumer Rights Day' marking that date, and on 15 March 1983 consumer organizations started observing that date as an occasion to promote basic rights of consumers.

World Consumer Rights Day is an annual occasion for celebration and solidarity within the international consumer movement. Participants observe the day by promoting the basic rights of all consumers, demanding that those rights are respected and protected, and protesting about the market abuses and social injustices which undermine them. World Consumer Rights Day is celebrated on 15 March every year.

== Partners ==
Consumers International works with the International Organization for Standardization to create standards that provide solutions to global challenges.

It holds General Consultative Status to the United Nations Economic and Social Council. This is the highest status granted by the United Nations to non-governmental organizations, allowing them to participate in the work of the United Nations.
