= Seat belt legislation in Canada =

Seat belt legislation in Canada is left to the provinces. All provinces in Canada have primary enforcement seat belt laws, which allow a police officer to stop and ticket a driver if they observed a violation. Ontario was the first province to pass a law which required vehicle occupants to wear seat belts, a law that came into effect on January 1, 1976.

== The laws by province ==
This table contains a brief summary of all seatbelt laws in Canada. This list includes only seatbelt laws, which often do not themselves apply to children; however, all provinces and territories have separate child restraint laws. A subsequent offense may be higher.

Province/Territory	Date of inception	Who is covered	Base fine before fees	Demerit points assigned	Usage
Alberta	July 1, 1987	Anyone in driver's seat or passenger seat	$162	0	92.0%
British Columbia	October 1, 1977	Age 16+ in all seats	$167	0	96.9%
Manitoba	April 1, 1984	Age 16+ in all seats	$299.65	2	93.8%
New Brunswick	November 1, 1983	Age 16+ in all seats	$172.50	2	94.8%
Newfoundland and Labrador	July 1, 1982	Age 16+ in all seats	$115	2	93.1%
Northwest Territories	July 1, 1988	Age 15+ in all seats Passenger <15	$150 $200	2	84.9%
Nova Scotia	January 1, 1985	Age 16+ in all seats	$157.50	2	90.1%
Ontario	January 1, 1976	Age 16+ in all seats	$240	2	96.0%
Prince Edward Island	July 1, 1987	Age 16+ in all seats	$110	3	89.7%
Quebec	August 15, 1976	Age 16+ in all seats	$115–154	3	96.0%
Saskatchewan	July 1, 1977	Age 16+ in all seats	$165	3	96.8%
Yukon	July 1, 1991	Age 15+ in all seats	$75	4	78.1%

== See also ==
- Seat belt legislation
- Seat belt legislation in the United States
- Seat belt use rates by country
