= JuniorNet =

- Industry: Internet & communications
- Founded: 1996; 30 years ago
- Headquarters: Boston, Massachusetts, United States
- Products: online services
- Website: juniornet.com at the Wayback Machine (archived 23 July 2010)

JuniorNet was a commercial online service provider in the United States which provided content for children.

== History ==
JuniorNet was founded in 1996 by Alan Rothenberg, a serial entrepreneur who previously created KinderActive, a children's educational CD-ROM producer. He raised $2 million from venture capitalists by spring 1997, and raised another $70 million with Lehman Brothers by April 1998.

In April 1999, RCN acquired a 47.5% stake in JuniorNet for $47 million. As part of the deal, JuniorNet bought Lancit Media, producer of The Puzzle Place and Reading Rainbow, from RCN for $22 million. RCN intended to integrate content from Lancit into JuniorNet as a broadband service, and offer JuniorNet as an add-on package to their cable and internet offerings.

JuniorNet rejected even limited e-commerce and advertising, instead relying exclusively on its $9.95 per month subscription fee as a revenue stream.

In June 2000, JuniorNet formed partnerships with South Carolina Educational Communications, Maryland Public Broadcasting Foundation, and Nebraskans for Public Television. The public television stations received equity stakes in JuniorNet and would receive commissions for new subscriptions generated through marketing by the stations. The stations could also offer cobranded versions of JuniorNet. Additionally, JuniorNet's subsidiary Lancit Media would produce content for the stations.

By December 2000, JuniorNet had laid off about a third of its staff of 120, bringing headcount to 80. Further layoffs occurred in February 2001.

In 2001, JuniorNet ceased operations. In the foreclosure process, JuniorNet was transferred to J2 Interactive, in which RCN would hold a 23.5% stake. Additionally, RCN regained full ownership of Lancit, which then became RCN Entertainment. In 2004, RCN Entertainment sold its catalogue to On Screen Entertainment.

In 2004, Encore published a CD-ROM including games from the JuniorNet service, entitled "Elementary Advantage 2004: JuniorNet Greatest Hits Vol. I".

== Content partners ==
JuniorNet sourced its content from some of the biggest children's content providers at the time.

- Bear in the Big Blue House from The Jim Henson Company
- Zillions from Consumer Reports parent Consumers Union
- Ranger Rick from the National Wildlife Federation
- Sports Illustrated for Kids from Sports Illustrated parent Time Inc., a unit of Time Warner
- Highlights for Children
- Weekly Reader
