= Derp =

Derp may refer to:

- Mr. Derp, a minor character in South Park, a show that popularized the Internet slang word derp
- Drug Effectiveness Review Project
- D.E.R.P., a robot character seen in the Fresh Beat Band of Spies episode "Dance Bots"
- "Derp", a track released in 2014 by Bassjackers and MAKJ
- Derp (hacker group), also known as Derptrolling, a former hacker group

== See also ==
- D'Erp Castle, the Netherlands
- Darp, a town in the Netherlands
- Derpy (disambiguation)
