= Our Lady of the Rosary Academy =

Location
- 4165 Eaton Street; Mountain View, (Jefferson County), Colorado 80212-7306; United States; 39°46′26″N 105°3′34″W

Information
- Type: Private, Coeducational
- Religious affiliation: Roman Catholic
- Established: 1978
- Principal: Mr. Lambrecht
- Grades: K–12
- Accreditation: National Association of Private Catholic Independent Schools
- Tuition: $5,000 (2007-2008)
- Website: ourladyoftherosaryacademy.com

Our Lady of the Rosary Academy is a private, Roman Catholic high school in Mountain View, Colorado. It is operated independent of the Roman Catholic Archdiocese of Denver.

== Background ==
Our Lady of the Rosary was established in 1978.
