= Consumer Reports =

American nonprofit organization

Consumer Reports, Inc.
- Founded: February 1936; 90 years ago (as Consumers Union)
- Founders: Arthur Kallet; Colston Warne
- Type: Nonprofit organization
- Location(s): 101 Truman Avenue; Yonkers, New York, U.S. 10703
- Key people: Phil Radford, President and CEO
- Revenue: $238 million (2024-2025)
- Employees: 550+ (2025)
- Website: www.consumerreports.org

Consumer Reports, known as CR and legally as Consumer Reports, Inc., formerly Consumers Union of United States, Inc. (CU), is an American 501(c)(3) nonprofit, nonpartisan organization dedicated to independent product testing and rating, investigative journalism, consumer-oriented research, public education, and consumer advocacy. In 2025, Phil Radford became the organization’s president and chief executive officer (CEO).

Founded in February 1936, the organization has more than five million members and publishes content through both its website and a magazine, also called Consumer Reports. These are subscription-based and provide reviews, ratings, recommendations, and advice across a wide range of products and services. The organization has also been included in other digital platforms.

Consumer Reports has a policy of independence, purchasing products anonymously at retail locations, and refusing traditional advertising. Throughout its history, the organization has influenced consumer protection legislation and contributed to product recalls and redesigns.

== History ==
Consumers Want to Know, a 1960 documentary on Consumer Reports

Advertisement for the first issue of Consumer Reports from the Communist Party's arts and contemporary politics magazine, The New Masses

Founded in 1936, CR was created to serve as a source of information that consumers could use to help assess the safety and performance of products. Since that time, CR has continued its testing and analysis of products and services and advocated for the consumer in legislative and rule-making areas. Among the reforms in which CR played a role were the advent of seat belt laws, exposure of the dangers of cigarettes, and more recently, the enhancement of consumer finance protection, the increase of consumer access to quality health care, and data privacy and security protections. Consumer Reports advocacy efforts focus on improving product safety and public health, saving people money, including energy and utilities, and ensuring consumers’ digital privacy and security.

=== Founding and early years ===
In 1927, F.J. Schlink and Stuart Chase published their best-selling book, Your Money's Worth, which saw massive readership due to the consumer movement. The demand for brand research led to Schlink to found the company Consumers' Research in 1927. The company was responsible for publishing Consumers’ Research Bulletin (previously named Consumer Club Commodity List). The subscriber count in 1933 was reported to be over 42,000. It was in this year, that Consumer Research moved its operations to New York City. Following this move, employees began to unionize, citing unfair pay. Schlink proceeded to fire the strikers. The former Consumers' Research employees, teamed up with "journalists, engineers, academics, and scientists" to found the company Consumers Union—now known as Consumer Reports—in February 1936. Over 250 Consumer Reports employees are represented by The Consumer Reports Guild. It has been represented by the NewsGuild of New York, the local branch of the NewsGuild-CWA, since 1951.

Consumers Union differentiated themselves from Consumers' Research by establishing a community amongst readers. Within the overall mission of creating more informed consumers, Consumers Union united with women's clubs and citizen groups, creating a progressive message. Consumers Union would surpass Schlink's Consumers' Research in subscribers by 1940, accumulating a readership of 71,000.

=== Resistance ===
Numerous businesses and corporations set out to suppress the actions of Consumers Union. In an effort to suppress the critiques of Consumers' Union, The New York Herald Tribune established an institute with the goal of demonstrating that the efforts of consumers groups were futile, in that businesses already conducted extensive product-testing.

Additional suppression came later from the House Un-American Activities Committee (created in 1938), which placed Consumers Union on a list of "subversive" organizations. This was because of the organization’s association with labor leaders, and its refusal to use advertising, with the latter point seen as a plot against free enterprise. Consumers Union was later removed from the list, and the plot against it instead served to bolster public opinion for Consumers Union.

=== Consumer advocacy ===
In World War II, Consumers Union took a stance in support of the war effort. They urged their supporters to put aside their personal interest by consuming less, and following the government ordered policies of consumption. They were also critical of businesses who saw the war period as an opportunity to advertise their products and as a result were wasting paper.

In the 1950s, now known as Consumer Reports, the organization conducted reviews of seat belts in cars and showed their importance. They also reported on the dangers of cigarettes. The Surgeon General’s 1964 smoking report cited Consumer Reports research.

In 2000, due to years of tests showing that many SUVs were prone to rollovers during sharp turns, Consumer Reports testified before Congress that all cars should undergo a rollover test as part of a national safety testing protocol. A rollover test became part of the National Highway Traffic Safety Administration’s assessment of new cars.

In 2017, Consumer Reports led a consortium that established a Digital Standard benchmark by which digital products could be measured.

The organization has also been involved with other issues, including:

==== Technology ====
- Sprint T-Mobile merger: The organization spoke against this merger citing the need for consumer choice and industry competition.
- T-Mobile’s acquisition of Mint: Consumer Reports joined other consumer advocates in calling on the FCC to impose a phone unlocking condition after T-Mobile proposed an acquisition of Mint Mobile.
- Net neutrality: The organization supported net neutrality protections to remain in place to provide consumers with better options.
- Right to repair: Consumer Reports’ advocates helped pass the U.S.’s first "right to repair" law in New York. This law gives consumers more choice in how they can get tech products fixed, rather than requiring them to work with only manufacturers or a manufacturer’s preferred repair service.

==== Data privacy ====
- Cambridge-Analytica data scandal: The organization supported stronger privacy laws in the wake of the Cambridge-Analytica data scandal.
- State Data Privacy Act: Consumer Reports and EPIC crafted a proposed State Data Privacy Act to improve consumer privacy protections in the absence of a federal law.

==== Artificial intelligence ====
- AI-Powered voice cloning: Consumer Reports raised concerns about consumer protection in light of the many AI-powered voice cloning tools available. The organization called on the Federal Trade Commission to take steps to expand enforcement and restrictions. Consumer Reports won an Anthem award for their investigation which showed AI voice cloning tools can be misused by scammers for identity theft and fraud.

==== Financial fairness ====
- Car insurance: Consumer Reports and ProPublica reported that racial disparities exist in car insurance premiums.

==== Food safety ====
- Heavy metals in baby food: Consumer Reports was involved in the passage of a law requiring manufacturers to test baby food for heavy metals. After the law was passed, the organization, along with Unleaded Kids, investigated baby food companies to determine if they were abiding by the law and if more work was needed.
- Heavy metals in protein supplements: Consumer Reports tested 23 protein supplements and found more than two-thirds contained more lead in a single serving than is safe for daily consumption according to Consumer Reports' food safety experts. Later, the organization tested five protein powders not included in the first tests. These five had levels of lead within the Consumer Reports' safe daily or near-daily consumption limits. The organization is calling on the U.S. Food and Drug Administration to limit lead in protein powders.
- Arsenic in rice: In 2026, Consumer Reports followed up 2012 and 2014 tests for arsenic in rice. The new study found arsenic in all 52 rice products tested, including brown, white, basmati, jasmine, sushi, arborio, precooked microwavable rice, and rice side dishes. In the 2014 study, 656 rice products showed concerning levels of arsenic exposure. Consumer Reports asked the Food and Drug Administration (FDA) to establish arsenic limits on all rice products because no amount of arsenic is safe.

=== Education and research ===
In 2019 and 2020, Duke University acquired the Consumer Reports' archive for the John W. Hartman Center for Sales, Advertising & Marketing History. The archive, which spans more than eight decades, includes artifacts, research files, testing information, published articles, and photographs to support the study of scientific product testing, consumer behavior and safety, advertising and marketing, journalism, consumer advocacy, rule- and law-making, and broader cultural and political history.

In 2025 and 2026, Duke University Libraries hosted two exhibits from the Consumer Reports collection. One exhibit displayed the role of product testing photography in communicating information and another recounted the organization's history with governments, youth education, product testing, and advocacy and legislative efforts.

== Rating method and impact ==
Consumer Reports formerly used a modified form of Harvey balls for qualitative comparison. The round ideograms were arranged from best to worst. On the left of the diagram, the red circle indicated the highest rating, the half red and white circle was the second highest rating, the white circle was neutral, the half black circle was the second-lowest rating, and the entirely black circle was the lowest rating possible.

As part of a wider rebranding of Consumer Reports in September 2016, the appearance of the magazine's rating system was significantly revamped. The Harvey balls were replaced with new color-coded circles: green for excellent; lime green for very good; yellow for good; orange for fair; and red for poor. It was stated that this new system will help improve the clarity of ratings tables by using a "universally understood" metaphor.

=== Rating and review methods ===
As of 2025, Consumer Reports had published more than 10,000 independent ratings and reviews of products and services.

Consumer Reports’ methods are transparent, allowing both consumers and industry professionals to understand how scores are calculated. The organization uses secret shoppers to purchase all rated products at online and retail prices on behalf of the organization. They do so anonymously, and CR accepts no free samples in order to limit bias from bribery and to prevent being given better than average samples.

Once purchased, Consumer Reports has dozens of specialized labs to review everything from exercise equipment to phones and TVs to food. Every purchased product goes through rigorous, standardized tests. CR also regularly collects data from member surveys, and factors that information into its ratings.

For most of CR's history, it minimized contact with government and industry experts "to avoid compromising the independence of its judgment". In 2007, in response to errors in infant car seat testing, it began accepting advice from a wide range of experts on designing tests, but not on final assessments. Also, at times CR allows manufacturers to review and respond to criticism before publication, and implement product changes. This sometimes leads to redesigns or recalls.

Some objective and comparative tests published by Consumer Reports are carried out under the umbrella of the international consumer organization International Consumer Research & Testing. Consumer Reports also uses outside labs for testing, including for 11 percent of tests in 2006.

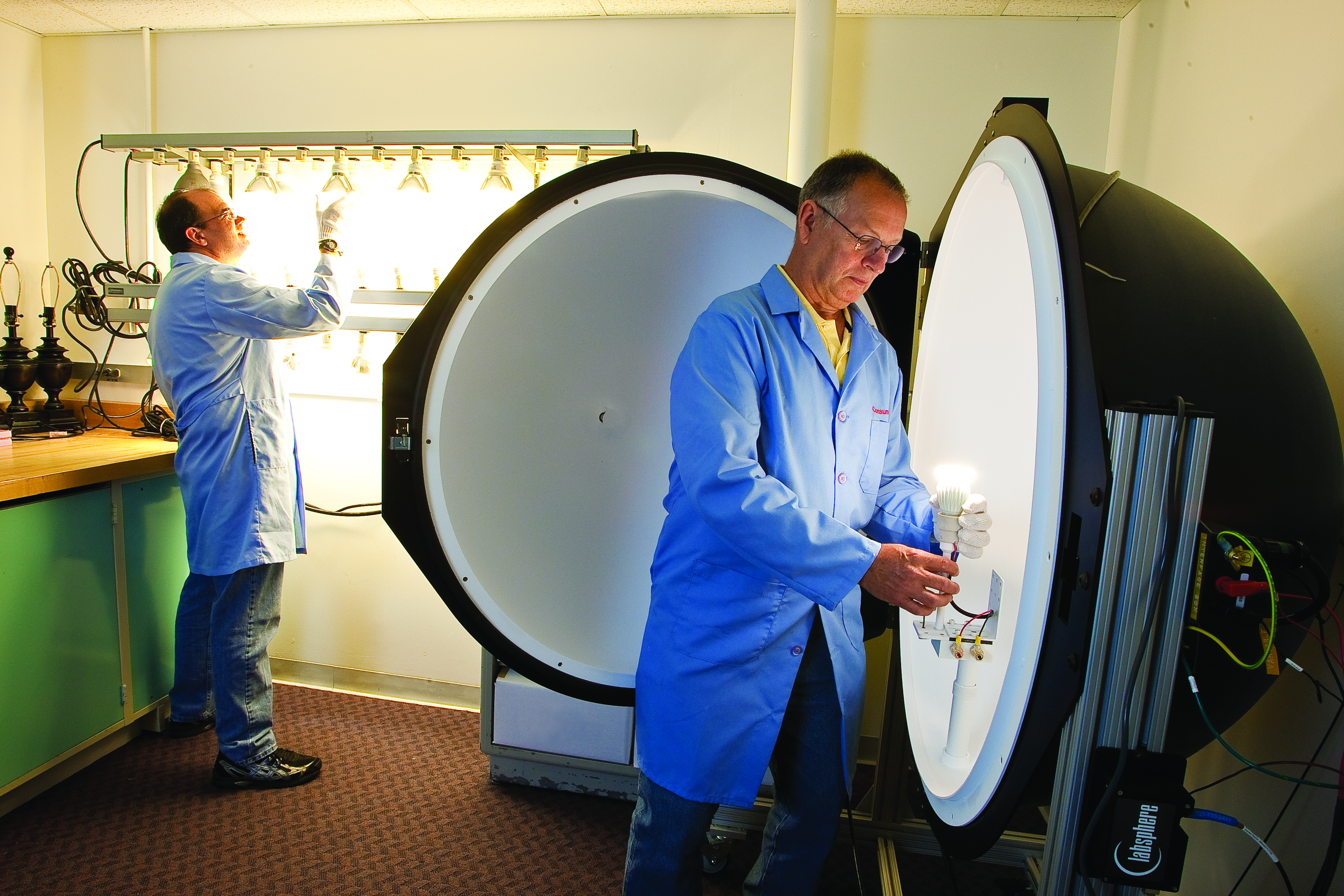
Testing electric light longevity and brightness testing

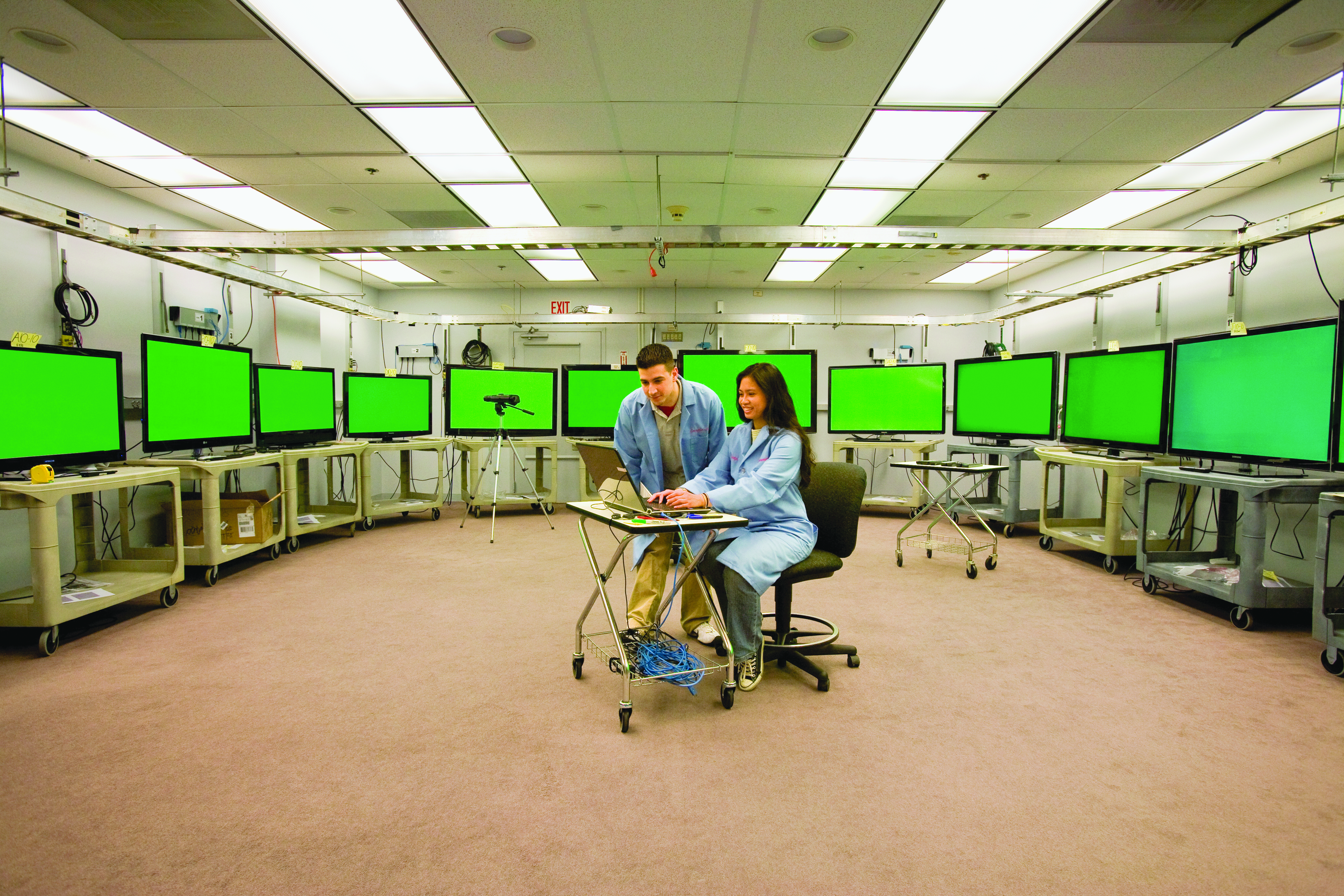
Television testing laboratory

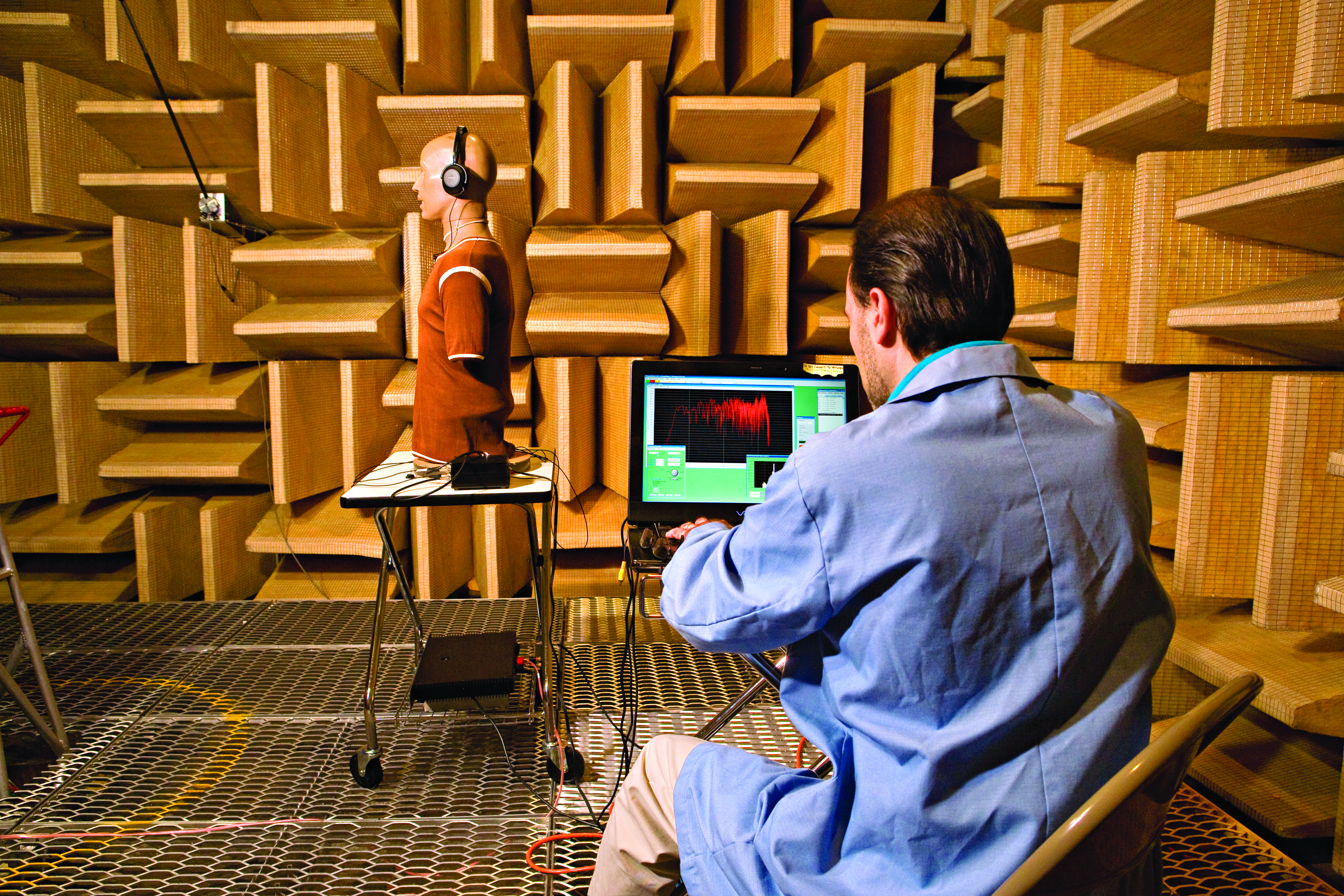
Product testing headphones in an anechoic chamber

=== Impact of testing and investigations ===
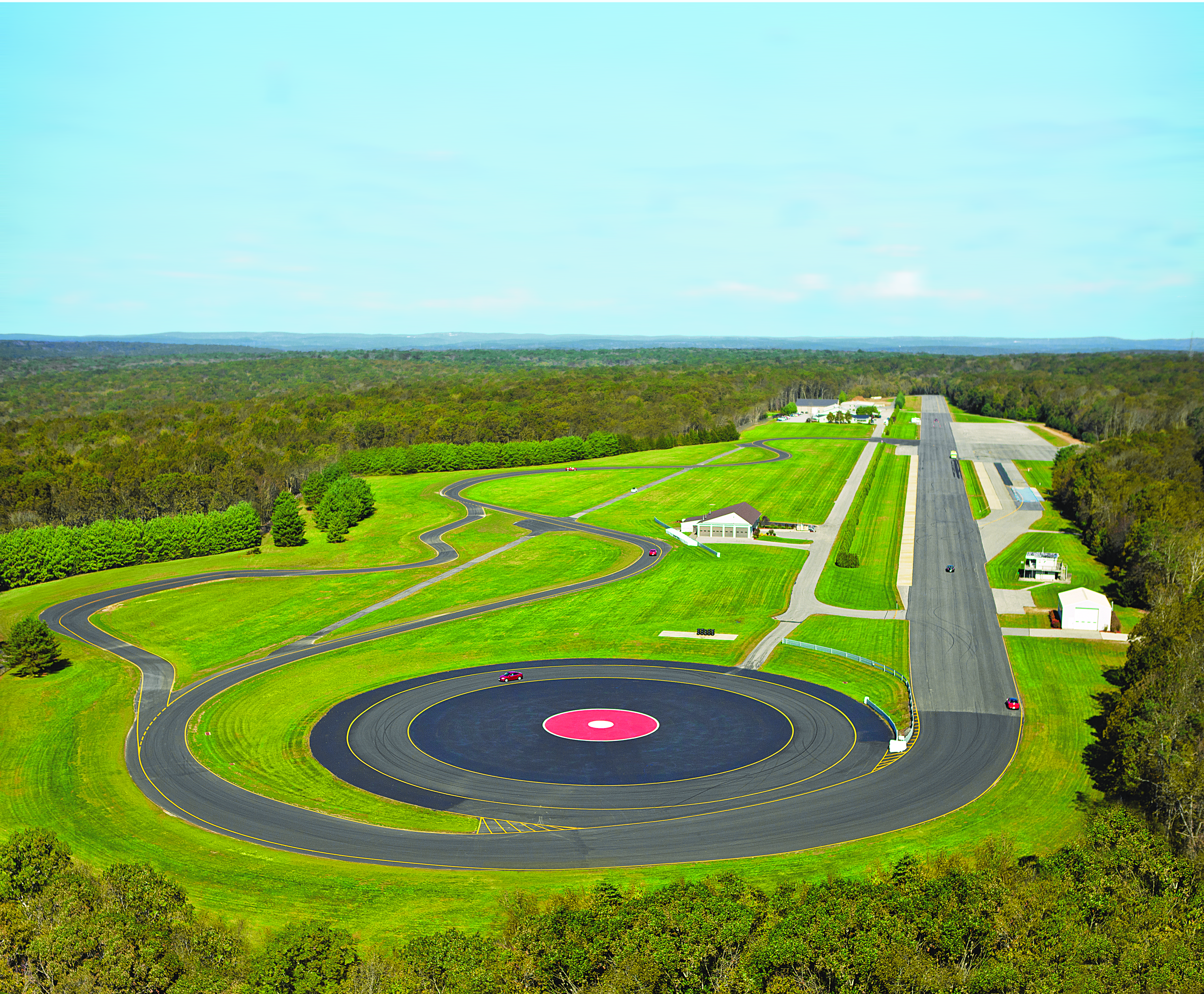
The Consumer Reports auto test track in East Haddam, Connecticut

Consumer Reports’ independent testing and investigations have led to manufacturer recalls, redesigns, and software fixes. Here are a few examples:

=== Automotive ===
==== Dodge Omni/Plymouth Horizon ====
In the July 1978 issue, Consumer Reports rated the Dodge Omni/Plymouth Horizon automobile "not acceptable", the first car it had judged such since the AMC Ambassador in 1968. In its testing they found the possibility of these models' developing an oscillatory yaw as a result of a sudden violent input to the steering; the manufacturer claimed: "Some do, some don't" show this behavior, but it has no "validity in the real world of driving". Nevertheless, the next year, these models included a lighter weight steering wheel rim and a steering damper, and Consumer Reports reported that the previous instability was no longer present.

==== Nissan Murano Crossover Utility Vehicle ====
In a 2003 issue of CR, the magazine tested the Nissan Murano crossover utility vehicle and did not recommend the vehicle because of a problem with its power steering, even though the vehicle had above-average reliability. The specific problem was that the steering would stiffen substantially on hard turning. CR recommended the 2005 model, which had addressed this problem.

==== BMW X5 SUV ====
BMW changed the software for the stability control in its X5 SUV after replicating a potential rollover problem discovered during a CR test.

==== Lexus GX 460 SUV ====
In 2010, CR rated the 2010 Lexus GX 460 SUV unsafe after the vehicle failed one of the magazine's emergency safety tests. Toyota temporarily suspended sales of the vehicle, and after conducting its own test acknowledged the problem and issued a recall for the vehicle, which later passed a CR re-test.

==== Tesla Model 3 ====
In May 2018, CR said it could not recommend the Tesla Model 3 due to concerns about the car's long stopping distance. Within days, Tesla issued a remote software update. CR retested the car's brakes, then gave the Model 3 a "recommended" rating.

=== Technology ===
==== Apple 2016 MacBook Pro ====
In 2016, CR found wildly inconsistent battery life in its testing of Apple's 2016 MacBook Pro. This led to the discovery of a bug in the Safari web browser, which Apple promptly fixed via a software update.

==== Instacart ====
In 2025, an investigation by Consumer Reports showed Instacart used an AI-driven dynamic pricing experiment to sometimes charge different shoppers different prices for the same items at the same store at the same time. Following public response to the investigation, Instacart ended its AI price-testing program. In 2026, legislation stemming from the investigation was passed in Maryland, Connecticut, New Jersey, and Seattle, Washington that includes prohibiting or restricting retailers and delivery services from using a consumer's personal data and AI-assisted pricing tools to generate surveillance, algorithmic, or dynamic pricing.

==== Samsung Smart Televisions ====
Samsung fixed certain smart televisions after Consumer Reports found they could be hacked.

==== Eken Video Doorbell ====
Consumer Reports found security vulnerabilities in video doorbells manufactured by Eken Group Ltd. and sold under various brand names. After CR shared its investigation, Eken issued a firmware fix.

=== Children's products ===
==== Fisher-Price ====
In 2019, Fisher-Price recalled all of its Rock ‘n Play sleepers, approximately 4.7 million, after CR published an investigation that found the product was tied to at least 32 infant deaths since 2009.

=== Food ===
==== Kraft Heinz ====
In 2024, Kraft Heinz Lunchables made for U.S. schools were pulled from school lunch programs due to low demand. A few months prior, CR had published its investigation into the school Lunchables, sharing that it had found relatively high levels of lead, cadmium, and sodium present.

== Editorial independence ==
=== Core policies ===
Consumer Reports is well known for its policies on editorial independence, which it says are to "maintain our independence and impartiality ... [so that] CR has no agenda other than the interests of consumers". CR has unusually strict requirements and sometimes has taken extraordinary steps; for example it declined to renew a car dealership's bulk subscription because of "the appearance of an impropriety".

=== No outside advertising ===
Consumer Reports does not allow outside advertising because it does not want to compromise its objectivity. The organization receives funding in other ways, namely from paid memberships, grants, donations, affiliate links, and through its commercial licensing program.

== Publications ==
Consumer Reports
- Consumer Reports cover dated November 2016
- Editor-in-Chief: Ellen Kunes, Editorial Director, Digital & Print
- Categories: Consumer advocacy
- Frequency: Monthly
- Circulation: 3,800,000
- Publisher: Consumer Reports
- First issue: May 1936; 90 years ago
- Country: United States
- Language: English
- Website: www.consumerreports.org
- ISSN: 0010-7174

=== Digital and Print Magazine ===
Consumer Reports publishes content through its digital platforms and produces a print magazine. These publications both provide consumers with product advice (the results of CR’s rigorous ratings work), as well as investigative reporting. Additionally, through its website, CR provides ratings and reviews for thousands products and services. It also provides recall information and video demonstrations.

The print magazine has been published since May 1936. Its first cover story was a report on the difference between Grade A and Grade B milk. Consumer Reports’ researchers found the two types of milk to be identical, and therefore did not recommend consumers spend more buying Grade A milk.

=== Television and podcasts ===
In 1990, Consumer Reports launched Consumer Reports Television. Like the rest of CR’s services, Consumer Reports TV accepts no advertising. It produces monthly news reports as well as specials, such as, "Buy Me That", from 1989, which discussed how TV advertising can mislead children. As of 2025, Consumer Reports produces its own podcasts in addition to videos for local broadcast and Telemundo stations. Digital content is also shared across the organization’s website, Amazon, Apple TV, MSN.com, and social media channels, including YouTube.

=== Content distribution ===
Over the years, Consumer Reports has published its content on other sites/platforms, including:

- Linking to shopping comparison service BizRate.com through its digital cameras section
- Allowing Yahoo to sell Consumer Reports buying guides online
- Apple News
- Apple News+

=== Newsletters ===
In 2025, Consumer Reports restarted their 1940s-era newsletter called Bread & Butter on Substack. The newsletter provides advice on deals and tips for saving money. Other newsletters from Consumer Reports cover topics including health, safety, home, and cars.

=== Previous publications ===
==== ShopSmart ====
On August 1, 2006, Consumer Reports launched ShopSmart, a magazine aimed at young women. The magazine’s last issue was produced in August/September 2015.

==== The Consumerist Blog ====
In 2008, Consumer Reports acquired The Consumerist blog from Gawker Media. It was shuttered in 2017, and its content folded into the Consumer Reports website.

==== Consumer Reports Best Buy Drugs ====
Consumer Reports Best Buy Drugs is available free on Consumer Reports Health.org. It compares prescription drugs in over 20 major categories, such as heart disease, blood pressure and diabetes, and gives comparative ratings of effectiveness and costs, in reports and tables, in web pages and PDF documents, in summary and detailed form.

==== Penny Power/Zillions ====
Consumer Reports published a kids' version of Consumer Reports called Penny Power in 1980, later changed in August 1990 to Zillions. This publication was similar to Consumer Reports but served a younger audience. At its peak, the magazine covered close to 350,000 subscribers. It gave children financial advice for budgeting their allowances and saving for a big purchase, reviewed kid-oriented consumer products (e.g., toys, clothes, electronics, food, videogames, etc.), and generally promoted smart consumerism in kids and teens; reviews of products came from kids of the age range a product was targeted toward. It also taught kids about deceitful marketing practices practiced by advertising agencies. The magazine folded in 2000.

=== Consumer Reports WebWatch ===
In 2001, Consumer Reports launched the grant-funded project Consumer Reports WebWatch, which aimed to educate consumers about online scams and other dangers. WebWatch was backed by The Pew Charitable Trusts, the John S. and James L. Knight Foundation, and the Open Society Institute. In 2009, WebWatch was shut down.

== Funding ==
=== Memberships and consumer engagement ===
Consumer Reports advocates for and with consumers and offers paid memberships to those who want access to its printed and digital publications. CR’s more than 5 million members have access to online tools like a car recall tracker and personalized content.

=== Grants ===
Consumer Reports occasionally receives grants from other organizations to be used toward specific research projects. For example, in 2012, the Pew Charitable Trust provided Consumer Reports with a grant so the organization could examine food for carcinogens, heavy metal contamination, and pathogens.

In 2021, the organization received a $375,000 grant from an environmental group, the Climate Imperative Foundation, to examine gas stoves and indoor air quality. After completing its study, Consumer Reports published an article entitled "Is Your Gas Range a Health Risk?" published on October 4, 2022. The organization included a note that the study was funded in part by a grant from the Climate Imperative Foundation. Other organizations that have provided grants include the Hewlett Foundation and the Ford Foundation. Ford has provided grants totaling more than $1 million in recent years.

=== Donations ===
Consumer Reports receives donations from individuals and organizations to fund various projects. In June 2019, Craig Newmark’s foundation, Craig Newmark Philanthropies, gave the organization $6 million to test internet-connected products for data privacy and security. This is done through the organization’s Innovation Lab.

Another donor is the Alfred P. Sloan Foundation, which donated to Consumer Reports’ Digital Standard project. This project created a set of digital rights and protections for which to evaluate manufacturers and advocate for consumer protections.

In October 2026, Consumer Reports hosted a 5K race at its 327-acre Auto Test Center in Colchester, Connecticut where participants ran on the testing track for the first time. The event was for Consumer Reports’ 90th anniversary and raised funds for the organization's independent product research and consumer advocacy.

=== Affiliate networks ===
Consumer Reports does not accept advertising from retailers or manufacturers, but it does use third-party affiliate links throughout its work. In this way, the organization can earn money without being incentivized to recommend a certain product.

Consumer Reports was an early adopter of affiliate networks. The nonprofit’s website uses affiliate links in its articles for various brands, models, product types, and categories.

At one point in its history, Consumer Reports also provided a website listing retailers included in the organization’s product reviews. This website was built and run by PriceGrabber. Through these affiliate links, PriceGrabber collected referral fees from retailers when someone clicked on a link. Consumer Reports accepted a percentage of this fee whether a purchase was made or not.

=== Commercial licensing program ===
Brands that have been rated and reviewed by Consumer Reports may pay to license CR content, however, they may not alter or excerpt the content, but must use it in its entirety. This means that brands must share with consumers any negative shortcomings alongside successes.

== Pushback from companies ==
Consumer Reports has been sued several times by companies unhappy with reviews of their products, but has never lost a case.

=== Bose ===
In 1971, Bose Corporation sued Consumer Reports (CR) for libel after CR reported in a review that the sound from the system it reviewed "tended to wander about the room". The case eventually reached the United States Supreme Court, which affirmed in Bose Corp. v. Consumers Union of United States, Inc. that CR's statement was made without actual malice and therefore was not libelous.

=== Suzuki ===
In 1988, Consumer Reports announced during a press conference that the Suzuki Samurai had demonstrated a tendency to roll and deemed it "not acceptable". Suzuki sued in 1996 after the Samurai was again mentioned in a CR anniversary issue. In July 2004, after eight years in court, the suit was settled and dismissed with no money changing hands and no retraction issued, but Consumers Union did agree to no longer refer to the 16-year-old test results of the 1988 Samurai in its advertising or promotional materials.

=== Rivera Isuzu ===
In December 1997, the Isuzu Trooper distributor in Puerto Rico sued CR, alleging that it had lost sales as a result of disparagement of the Trooper by the Consumers Union of the United States (CU). A trial court granted the motion for summary judgment by the CU, and the U.S. Court of Appeals for the First Circuit affirmed the favorable judgment.

=== Sharper Image ===
In 2003, Sharper Image sued CR in California for product disparagement over negative reviews of its Ionic Breeze Quadra air purifier. CR moved for dismissal on October 31, 2003, and the case was dismissed in November 2004. The decision also awarded CR $525,000 in legal fees and costs.

== Controversial findings ==
=== Child safety seats ===
The February 2007 issue of Consumer Reports stated that only two of the child safety seats it tested for that issue passed the organization's side impact tests. The National Highway Traffic Safety Administration, which subsequently retested the seats, found that all those seats passed the corresponding NHTSA tests at the speeds described in the magazine report. The CR article reported that the tests simulated the effects of collisions at 38.5 mph. However, the tests that were completed in fact simulated collisions at 70 mph. CR stated in a letter from its president Jim Guest to its subscribers that it would retest the seats. The article was removed from the CR website, and on January 18, 2007, the organization posted a note on its home page about the misleading tests. Subscribers were also sent a postcard apologizing for the errors. On January 28, 2007, The New York Times published an op-ed from Joan Claybrook, who served on the board of CR from 1982 to 2006 and was the head of the National Highway Traffic Safety Administration from 1977 to 1981, where she discussed the sequence of events leading to the publishing of the erroneous information.

=== Iams dog food ===
In February 1998, the organization tested pet food and claimed that Iams dog food was nutritionally deficient. It later retracted the report claiming that there had been "a systemic error in the measurements of various minerals we tested – potassium, calcium and magnesium".

=== Hybrid vehicles ===
In 2006, Consumer Reports said six hybrid vehicles would probably not save owners money. The organization later discovered that it had miscalculated depreciation and released an update stating that four of the six vehicles would save the buyers money if the vehicles were kept for five years (and received the federal tax credit for hybrid vehicles, which expired after each manufacturer sold 60,000 hybrid vehicles).

== Leadership and structure ==
Prominent consumer advocate Ralph Nader was on the board of directors, but left in 1975 due to a "division of philosophy" with the organization. Nader wanted Consumer Reports to focus on policy and product advocacy, while Karpatkin focused on product rating and reviews. Karpatkin was appointed executive director in 1974 and retired as president in the early 2000s.

In 2023, Consumer Reports had an annual budget of over US$30 million, which supported 60 labs and teams of engineers and other employees.

In January 2025, Consumer Reports named Phil Radford as its next president and CEO. Radford was previously chief strategy officer at Sierra Club, CEO of Greenpeace, and worked with the Public Interest Research Group and Public Citizen. Consumer Reports had over 5 million members as of April 2025.

== See also ==
- Consumer protection
- Consumer education
- Australian Consumers' Association
- Consumers' Institute of New Zealand
- Consumers International
- Consumers' Research
- Euroconsumers and ICRT International Consumer Research and Testing
- Good Housekeeping Institute
- Stiftung Warentest
- UFC Que Choisir, France's most important consumers' group.
- Underwriters Laboratories
- Which?
