= Click It or Ticket =

Safety belt awareness slogan

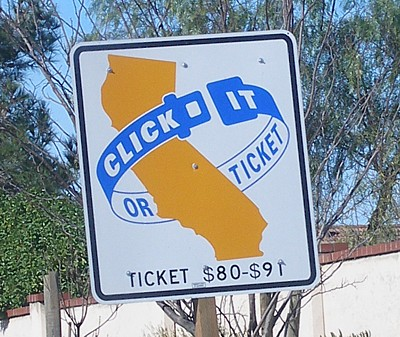
California's version of the campaign includes widespread placement of these traffic signs

Click It or Ticket is a National Highway Traffic Safety Administration campaign aimed at increasing the use of seat belts among young people in the United States. The campaign relies heavily on targeted advertising aimed at teens and young adults.

The Click It or Ticket campaign has existed at state level for many years. In 1993, Governor Jim Hunt launched the campaign in North Carolina in conjunction with a "primary enforcement safety belt law", which allows law enforcement officers to issue a safety belt citation, without observing another offense. Since then, other states have adopted the campaign. In May 2002, the ten states with the most comprehensive campaigns saw an increase of 8.6 percentage points, from 68.5% to 77.1%, in safety belt usage over a four-week period (Solomon, Ulmer, & Preusser, 2002).

== History ==
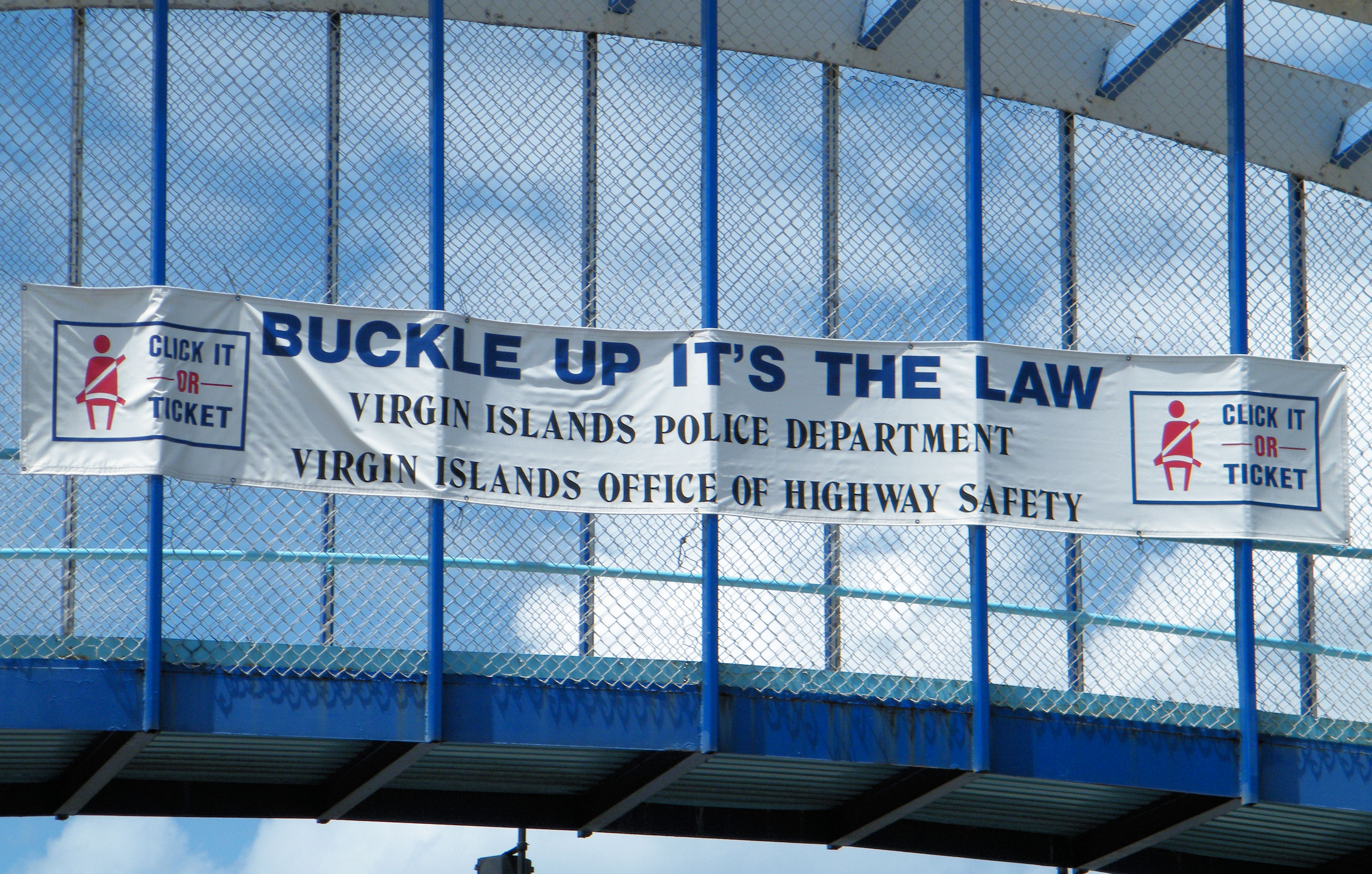
Click It or Ticket-sponsored banner in the U.S. Virgin Islands

Before 1980, usage of seat belts in the United States lingered around 11% despite volunteer and educational campaigns at local, county, and state levels. Between 1980 and 1984, individual organizations, public education programs, incentives and policy changes strove to increase the use of seat belts. However, these efforts failed to significantly affect usage in large, metropolitan areas, and by the end of the effort national seat belt usage had reached only 15%.

In 1984, New York became the first state to enact a mandatory seat belt use law, and by 1990, 37 other states had followed suit. The vast majority of these laws were "secondary safety belt laws", meaning that an officer had to observe another traffic violation before issuing a citation for a seat belt infraction. Despite this, the national usage rate climbed from 15% to 50%.

== Campaign methods ==
Seat belts have been proven to be one of the most effective safety devices in vehicles. According to the National Highway Traffic Safety Administration (NHTSA), seat belts saved an estimated 14,955 lives in 2017 alone. Despite these numbers, some individuals still fail to buckle up, putting their lives and the lives of others at risk. Educating the public about the importance of seat belt safety is crucial. By wearing a seat belt, individuals significantly reduce the risk of severe injury or death in the event of a crash. It's not just about obeying the law; it's about taking responsibility for one's safety and the safety of others.

The Click it or Ticket campaign is a nationwide initiative aimed at increasing seat belt usage through a combination of education and enforcement. It was launched in 1993 by the NHTSA and has since become a highly recognized and effective campaign. The campaign's main goal is to remind drivers and passengers that seat belt laws are strictly enforced, and failure to comply can result in fines and penalties. Law enforcement agencies play a crucial role in this campaign by conducting seat belt enforcement blitzes and increasing visibility on the roads.

The national television ad [airing] on several major networks features people driving in several regions of the country without their safety belts on. They receive a ticket, and then buckle up. The ads [appear] primarily in programs that deliver large audiences of teens and young adults—especially men. The programs include Fear Factor, WWE Smackdown, Major League Baseball, NBA Conference Finals, NASCAR Live, and the Indy 500.

The campaign is also stressing strict enforcement of safety belt laws, in particular, the "Primary safety belt laws", which allow law enforcement officers issue a safety belt citation without observing another offense. New Hampshire, the state with historically the lowest safety belt usage, is the only state without an adult safety belt law. Massachusetts, the state with the second lowest usage, has only a secondary safety belt law, which requires officers to observe another driving offense before issuing a safety belt citation. Enforcement of safety belt laws of both types is to be made possible by checkpoints and saturation patrols that will detect violations of safety belt and child passenger safety laws.

== Success ==
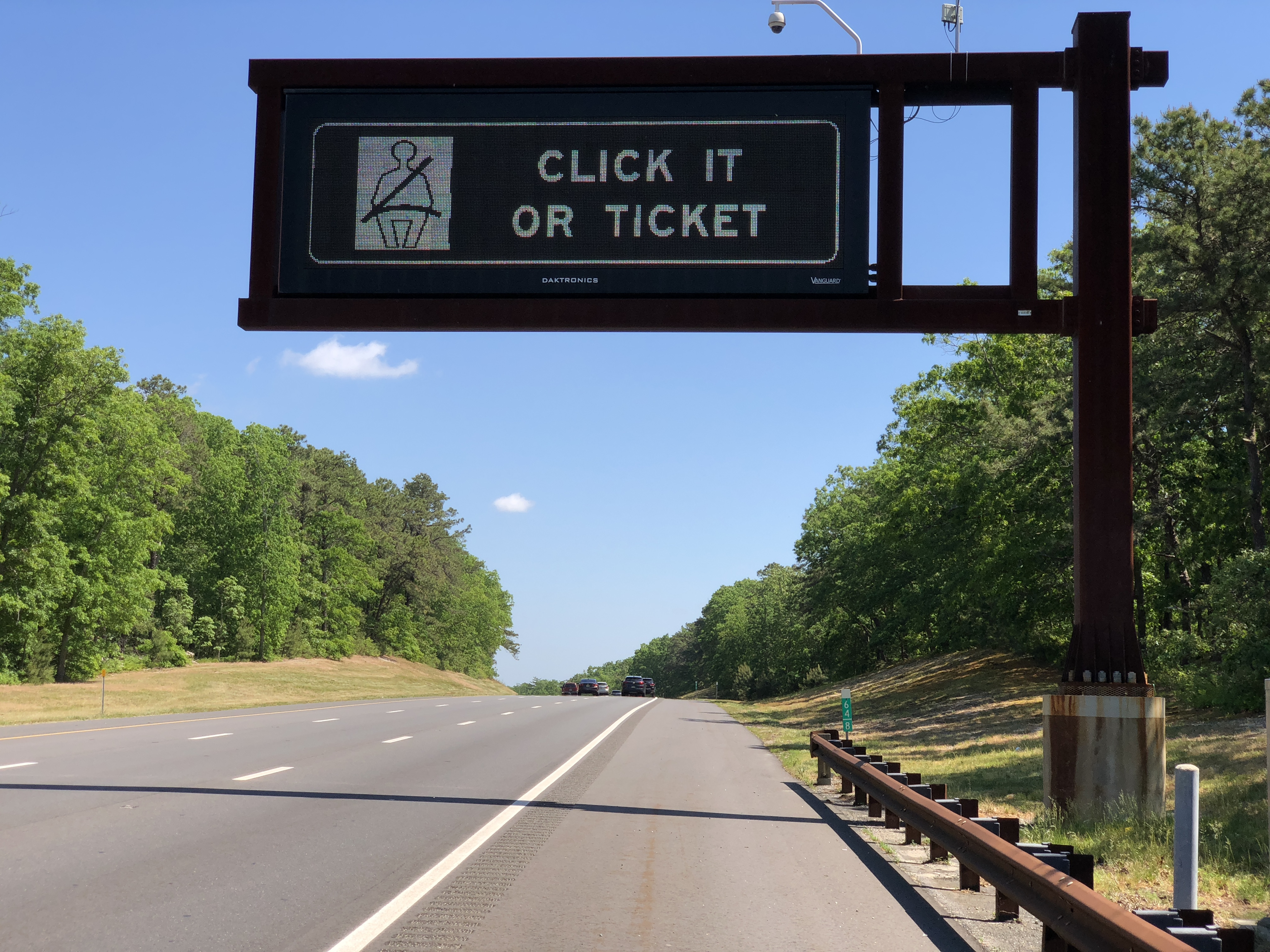
Variable-message sign with a Click It or Ticket message along the Garden State Parkway in New Jersey

Figures released by the U.S. Department of Transportation, after amplifying the advertising and enforcement campaign on May 19, 2003, indicated that "National belt use among young men and women ages 16-24 moved from 65% to 72%, and 73% to 80% respectively, while belt use in the overall population increased from 75% to 79%."

== Opposition ==
Opposition to the effort is primarily based on the belief that requiring wearing of a seatbelt is a violation of civil rights. For example, Prof. Walter E. Williams of George Mason University writes, "The point is whether government has a right to coerce us into taking care of ourselves. If eating what we wish is our business and not that of government, then why should we accept government's coercing us to wear seat belts?" Journalist Scott Indrisek has strenuously worked to oppose mandatory seat belt efforts, which he calls "a black stain on America." Additional objections settle specifically around the assertion that a seatbelt is a medical device, and because one is entitled to make their own medical decisions they should also be permitted to make their own decisions about wearing a seatbelt.

In Maryland, former Governor Robert Ehrlich opposed spotlights used by police officers to see into vehicles at night to determine if seat belts were being used on the basis that this violated privacy. Nighttime enforcement was suspended at the governor's request. Nighttime enforcement was resumed by Ehrlich's successor, Martin O'Malley, hours after O'Malley took office in January 2007.

During the COVID-19 pandemic after seeing facemask orders/mandates have been being compared to seat belt laws, many states in 2021 have tried to repeal their seat belt laws.

== See also ==
- Clunk Click Every Trip
- Seat belt legislation
- Seat belt legislation in the United States
