= Road Traffic (Safety Equipment) (Amendment) Regulation 2025 =

Government of Hong Kong
- Territorial extent: Hong Kong
- Enacted: 5 September 2025
- Effective: 25 January 2026
- Repealed: 6 February 2026 (for bus seat belt rules only)
- Administered by: Transport Department
- Introduced by: Mable Chan (Secretary for Transport and Logistics)

Amends
- Road Traffic (Safety Equipment) Regulation

Amended by
- Road Traffic (Safety Equipment) (Amendment) Regulation 2026

Keywords
- seat belt legislation
- Status: Amended

Road Traffic (Safety Equipment) (Amendment) Regulation 2025 (Chinese: 《2025年道路交通（安全裝備）（修訂）規例》) is a regulation in Hong Kong that amends the statutory regulation of Road Traffic (Safety Equipment) Regulation. The amendments were enacted by the government under the procedures for subsidiary legislation in September 2025, and came into force in January 2026. The amendments, on which the public was not consulted, contain a new requirement for all passengers to wear seat belts in buses. The new text, known as the "bus seat belt rules" or "bus seat belt law", caused widespread backlash for the inconvenience caused. The seat belt provision was suspended a week after the implementation due to deficiencies in the law book before officially repealed.

== Background ==
Following the bus crash on Tai Po Road in 2018 that killed 19 passengers, the government set up the Independent Review Committee on Hong Kong’s Franchised Bus Service to review the cause of the accident and to review the safety regulations for bus services. The committee concluded that the government should conduct a cost/benefit analysis for retrofitting seat belts on the upper decks of buses, and consider if the public should be mandated to wear seat belts to reduce thrown out risks.

== Enactment ==
The Road Traffic (Safety Equipment) (Amendment) Regulation 2025 was gazetted on 5 September 2025 as a subsidiary legislation and subject to the procedure of "negative vetting", meaning the legislation is enacted unless the legislature objects to it. The regulation intends to impose new requirements for passengers to wear seat belts on buses, minibuses, taxis, and commercial vehicles when the seat belts are available. Passengers who failed to do so face fines of up to HK$5,000 or three months in prison. The legislation states that the amendments will be effective on 25 January 2026.

Upon gazettal, the regulation was passed to the Legislative Council. A committee was formed to examine the provisions at a meeting on 18 September, where all members supported strengthening safety measures and decided a public consultation is not needed as the government has already consulted industry stakeholders. The meeting lasted for three hours only. The law formally passed the legislature in October without amendments.

== Justification ==
Chief Executive John Lee said while the new requirements would bring behavioural changes and inconveniences, they are intended to protect safety. He quoted statistics that seat belts can reduce the risk of death and serious injury of drivers and passengers in collisions by 40% and 70% respectively. However, the safety belt rules do not extend to standing passengers who are more vulnerable to safety hazards, prompting questions from the public. A Ming Pao report found that over the past decade, more than 70% deaths and over 59% of those injured critically in bus accidents are those standing in the bus.

Although the government repeatedly justify the new rules by the severity of the 2018 crash, the committee did not make any suggestion for legislating the mandatory wearing of seat belts. Lee himself did not wear the seat belt as well when filmed in 2023. He and officials added that mandatory wearing of seat belts is common across the globe, as foreign countries have adopted similar measures for a long time. The public on the other hand found that most of foreign rules on seat belts granted exemptions for urban bus routes, while the committee's report states that none of the reviewed overseas jurisdictions have statutory requirements for the seat belts, and that urban buses for short journeys have no such requirement. In response, the authorities said they decided against setting exemptions because roads in Hong Kong are more hilly, twisty, and complicated. Transport minister Mable Chan did not say whether government's explanations were misleading.

== Controversies ==
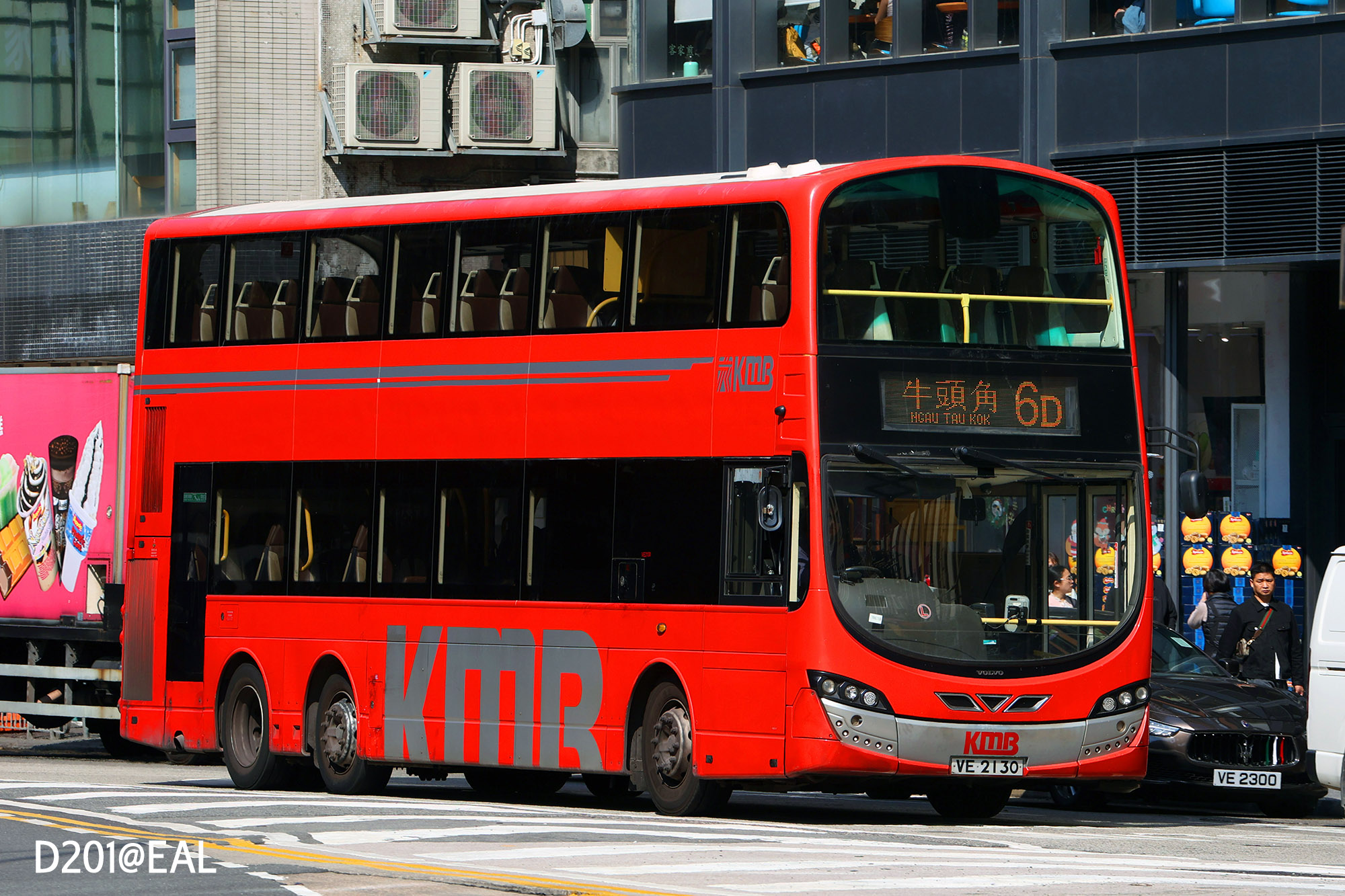
A bus in January 2026

The regulation soon sparked widespread public backlash after coming into effect, mainly for the inconvenience caused. Under the law, bus operators should ensure the seat belts are well maintained and should not allow passengers to take a seat where the seat belt is not functioning. However, multiple seat belts were found to be not working or not maintained in good conditions. A passenger was trapped in his seat for 45 minutes after the lock of the belt was stuffed with an aluminum foil. The operation mobilised 16 firefighters, 4 medics and 3 fire trucks. On two separate occasions, a seat belt was cut off, and a passenger was arrested after assaulting another for wearing the belt slowly. The seat belts are also too short for passengers wearing thick clothes. Some preferred standing instead of sitting to avoid penalty. Mable Chan said she noted public's comments about the inconvenience and discomfort, as well as the hygiene concerns. She said the government aims to address and improve these matters as soon as possible.

The penalty of not abiding the rules is also slammed to be too harsh, which is more serious than jumping red lights or speeding. Officials said passengers should be responsible for their own safety, stressing the necessity to build up a behaviour in the society through deterrence by serious punishment. As the controversies grew, Chan said the police indicated that their emphasis will be on "education and publicity" in the initial phase of implementation, aiming to handle this in a humane way, and claiming the policy is not intended to punish passengers.

Former pro-government MP Chan Yuen-han suggested the government to ban all "British colonial" double-decker buses and prohibit standing in buses to ensure safety, saying double-decker is not suitable for terrains like Hong Kong.

== Repeal ==
Drivers and passengers occupying the seats of these vehicles (whether newly registered or not), where seat belts are fitted, are required to wear them.

— Government press release on 8 January 2026

8D. Passengers required to wear seat belts

[...] a person must not ride as a passenger in a passenger’s seat of a bus to which regulation 8AB applies on any road, unless the person is securely fastened to the seat by means of a seat belt, if any, provided for the seat.

8AB. Seat belts and anchorage points for passenger’s seats

[...] (4) This regulation— (a) applies to every bus first registered on or after 25 January 2026; [...]

— Road Traffic (Safety Equipment) Regulations, as amended

Doreen Kong, the former legislator who was also one of the committee members that scrutinised the rules, wrote on social media on 29 January that according to the regulation wording, the rule apparently is applicable to buses registered only after the law took effect. This contradicts the government's long-standing narrative at press conferences and press releases that passengers on all buses, whether new or old, should wear the seat belt.

According to media reports, John Lee ordered an immediate review of the law. A day after Kong's revelation, Mable Chan admitted the current text has a "technical shortcoming" and thereby could not adequately reflect the legislative intent. Chan confirmed the relevant provision will be repeal as soon as possible. The new text will be sent to consult the Legislative Council before re-enacting it. Chan said the situation is not satisfactory, but did not apologise for the chaos. Secretary for Justice Paul Lam did not make any comment on the drafting of this law.

The executive and legislative branches were both criticised for the massive and gross oversight, as none of the officials nor legislators from all levels found out the inconsistencies from the beginning. Regina Ip, the non-official convener of the Executive Council, said responsible officials should be held accountable for this serious administrative negligence. She also said legislators should scrutinise the bills and oversee government's work carefully, instead of rushing to adopt the law. Pro-democracy ex-MP Lee Wing-tat said the legislature is just a rubber stamp without aware of the consequences brought by new legislations. Some committee members acknowledged that they failed to anticipate the difficulty in implementing the law. Kong added that under the principle of "executive dominance", the government does not wish to see legislators inspecting the provisions too closely.

The government officially repealed section 8D after the Road Traffic (Safety Equipment) (Amendment) Regulation 2026 was gazetted on 6 February.
