= Derpy =

Derpy may refer to:

- Derpy Hooves, a character from the My Little Pony franchise
- Derpy, a character from the film KPop Demon Hunters

== See also ==
- Derp (disambiguation)
