= Seat belt use rates by country =

This is a table of seat belt use rates (percent) in various countries worldwide.

Seat belt use rates in 2017 metrics might be part of some safety process.

Countries, territories and areas	All occupants	Front seat	Rear seat	Drivers only
Albania	87	85	80	95
Angola	65	40	10	60
Argentina	43.6	40.8	23.1	50.2
Armenia		70		70
Australia		97	96	
Austria		95	93	95
Azerbaijan	30	40	20	80
Belgium	91.7	92.2	85.5	91.5
Bolivia	9.7	3.5	0.5	20.8
Bosnia and Herzegovina		51	11	48
Brazil		79.4	50.2	
Bulgaria	80			
Canada	95.3	95.2	89.2	95.7
Chile	49.6	59	14	76
China				36.7
Colombia	47.1	64.2	2.2	75
Republic of the Congo		4	4	22
Costa Rica	76.7	75.1	35.6	77.8
Croatia	58	61.9	13.9	61.1
Cuba		30		35
Czech Republic		98	72	95
Denmark		96	91	88/89/96
Dominican Republic	34	18	5	45
Ecuador	36	26	2	80
Eritrea		80		80
Estonia	95	97.3	81.8	97.8
Ethiopia	< 1			
Fiji	72	75	5	90
Finland	94	95	85	96
France		98	88	
Georgia (country)		60		70
Germany	98	98	99	98
Ghana	35	18.4	3.5	55.6
Greece	72	74	23	77
Guyana	42	95		95
Hungary	81	82.8	38.5	81.7
Iceland	90	93	86	90
India		3.5 - 11		14 - 40
Indonesia	69			
Iran	68.5	93	15	95
Republic of Ireland	91	94	74	92
Israel	87.9	88.7	69.7	91.2
Italy		61.9	15.4	
Jamaica		54	4	51
Japan	94.9/89.5	98/94.9	71.8/36	99.5/98.5
Latvia		84.7	53	81
Lithuania	94	97	30	
Luxembourg	92	90	76	93
Malawi		21		25.8
Malaysia	48.4	73.8	9.6	82.9
Mali				20
Mauritius		97.4	0.2	93.8
Mexico	58.9	49	5.6	81.4
Montenegro	35	40	5	60
Morocco	64	63.2	22.3	66.7
Myanmar				7.4
Netherlands	95.8	96.6	82	96.9
New Zealand		97	92	97
North Macedonia	14.6	19.8	3.1	21
Norway	94.7 - 96	95.2 - 95.7		95.9 - 97.7
Oman				98
Peru	32.3	15.8	0.4	58.2
Philippines				79.7
Poland	94	96	76	95
Portugal	94.9	95.7	77.2	96.4
South Korea	84	83	30	94
Moldova		61.8	17.5	65.5
Russia		66 - 83	20 - 50	76 - 86
Samoa	100	100	100	100
Serbia	66.2	75.1	10.1	77
Slovenia	82.2	91.8	68.6	90.4
South Africa		31		33
Spain	88.3	90.5	80.6	90.3
Sri Lanka		75	75	75
Suriname		75	8	75
Sweden	97	96	90	98
Switzerland		94	86	94
Syria		90		90
Turkey		40.6		50.1
Thailand		40		58
United Kingdom	97.5 - 98	94.6 - 98	90.3 - 94	95.3 - 98
United States	90.1	90.1	74.8	90.5
Uruguay	62.8	62.8	33	69.1
Vanuatu	20	20	10	41

Seat belt use rates by country (driver) in 2013
Source WHO

== See also ==
- Seat belt legislation
- Seat belt use rates in the United States
