= Seat belt laws in the United States =

Seat belt laws for front seat passengers in the 50 U.S. states, the District of Columbia, and the 5 inhabited U.S. territories: No enforcement for adults (primary enforcement for minors) Secondary enforcement Secondary enforcement; primary under certain ages Primary enforcement

Most seat belt laws in the United States are left to state law. The first seat belt law was a federal law, Title 49 of the United States Code, Chapter 301, Motor Safety Standard, which took effect on January 1, 1968, that required all vehicles (except buses) to be fitted with seat belts in all designated seating positions. This law has since been modified to require three-point seat belts in outboard-seating positions, and finally three-point seat belts in all seating positions. Seat-belt use was voluntary until New York became the first state to require vehicle occupants to wear seat belts, effective December 1, 1984. By the end of 1995, 50 of the 51 jurisdictions comprising the 50 states and the District of Columbia had adult seat-belt use laws. As of June 2026, New Hampshire remained the only state without an adult seat-belt use law.

== Primary and secondary enforcement ==
U.S. seat belt use laws may be subject to primary enforcement or secondary enforcement. Primary enforcement allows a law enforcement officer to stop and ticket a driver if they observe a violation. Secondary enforcement means that a police officer may stop or cite a driver for a seat belt violation only if the driver committed another primary violation (such as speeding, running a stop sign, etc.) at the same time. New Hampshire is the only U.S. state that does not by law require adult drivers to wear safety belts while operating a motor vehicle.

In 15 of the 50 states, non-use of seat belts is considered a secondary offense, which means that a police officer cannot stop and ticket a driver for the sole offense of not wearing a seat belt. (One exception to this is Colorado, where children not properly restrained is a primary offense and brings a much larger fine.) If a driver commits a primary violation (e.g., for speeding), they may additionally be charged for not wearing a seat belt. In most states, seat belt non-use was originally a secondary offense. Many states later changed it to a primary offense, the first being California in 1993. Of the 35 states with primary seat belt use laws, all but California, Connecticut, Hawaii, Iowa, New Mexico, New York, North Carolina, Oregon, and Washington originally had only secondary enforcement laws.

Thirty-five states, the District of Columbia, American Samoa, Guam, the Northern Mariana Islands, Puerto Rico and the U.S. Virgin Islands have primary enforcement laws for front seats.

== Laws and rules by state and territory ==
Raw data
Calendar-year-end cumulative number of the 50 states and the District of Columbia whose initial adult seat-belt-law effective date had occurred, 1984–1997.

This table summarizes seat belt use laws in the United States.

Seat belt use laws often do not themselves apply to children. Even so, all 50 U.S. states, the District of Columbia, and all five inhabited U.S. territories have separate child restraint laws. (Note: One territory in the U.S. Minor Outlying Islands (Wake Island) requires all occupants of vehicles to wear seat belts.) The table shows only the base fine, but not applicable add-on fees in many areas, such as the head injury fund and court security fees, which can increase the total assessed fine by up to a factor of five. These are also "first offense" fines, and subsequent offenses may be much higher.

Twenty-three states, the District of Columbia, Guam, and the Northern Mariana Islands had seat belt usage of 90% or higher in 2017.

State, federal district, or territory	Type of law	Date of first law	Who is covered	Base fine before fees	Seat Belt Usage (2017) (Note: 2016 rate for the Virgin Islands.)
Alabama	Primary Enforcement	July 18, 1991	All ages in all seats	$25	92.9%
Alaska	Primary Enforcement	September 12, 1990	All ages in all seats	$15 ($25 actual)	90.1%
American Samoa	Primary Enforcement	—	All ages in front seats	$25	84.9%
Arizona	Secondary Enforcement^{1}	January 1, 1991	All ages in front seats; Under age 16 in all seats	$10 ($37.20 actual)	86.1%
Arkansas	Primary Enforcement	July 15, 1991	All ages in front seats; Under age 16 in all seats	$25	81.0%
California	Primary Enforcement	January 1, 1986	All ages in all seats	$20 ($162 actual); $50 second offense ($190 actual)^{6}	96.2%
Colorado	Secondary Enforcement^{2} Exception Mountain View where it is a primary violation	July 1, 1987	All ages in front seats; Under age 18 in all seats	$71	83.8%
Connecticut	Primary Enforcement	January 1, 1986	All ages in all seats	$92	90.3%
Delaware	Primary Enforcement	January 1, 1992	All ages in all seats	$25	91.4%
District of Columbia	Primary Enforcement	December 12, 1985	All ages in all seats	$50^{4}	93.6%
Florida	Primary Enforcement	July 1, 1986	All ages in front seats; Under age 18 in all seats	$30 ($116 actual)	90.2%
(Georgia (U.S. state)) Georgia	Primary Enforcement	July 1, 1996	All ages in front seats; Under age 18 in all seats	$15	97.1%
Guam	Primary Enforcement	—	All ages in all seats	$100	91.0%
Hawaii	Primary Enforcement	December 16, 1985	All ages in all seats	$45 ($112 actual)	96.9%
Idaho	Secondary Enforcement^{3}	July 1, 1986	All ages in all seats	$10 ($51.50 actual)	81.2%
Illinois	Primary Enforcement	January 1, 1988	All ages in all seats	$164 minimum fine	93.8%
Indiana	Primary Enforcement	July 1, 1987	All ages in all seats	$25	93.0%
Iowa	Primary Enforcement	July 1, 1986	All ages in front seats; Under 18 in rear seats	$25 ($127.50 actual)	91.4%
Kansas	Primary Enforcement^{4}	July 1, 1986	Age 14+ in all seats	$60 for age 14-17; $10 for 18+	82.0%
Kentucky	Primary Enforcement	July 15, 1994	Age 7 and younger and over 57 in (140 cm) in all seats; 8+ in all seats	$25	86.8%
Louisiana	Primary Enforcement	July 1, 1986	Age 13+ in front seats	$25	87.1%
Maine	Primary Enforcement	December 26, 1995	Age 18+ in all seats	$50	88.9%
Maryland	Primary Enforcement^{4}	July 1, 1986	Age 16+ in all seats	$83	92.1%
Massachusetts	Secondary Enforcement	February 1, 1994	Age 13+ in all seats	$25	73.7%
Michigan	Primary Enforcement	July 1, 1985	Age 16+ in front seats, under 16 in rear seats	$25 ($65 actual)	94.1%
Minnesota	Primary Enforcement	August 1, 1986	7 and younger and over 57 in (140 cm) in all seats; 8+ in all seats	$25 +$75 fee	92.0%
Mississippi	Primary Enforcement	July 1, 1994	Age 7+ in all seats	$25	78.8%
Missouri	Secondary Enforcement^{2}	September 28, 1985	Age 16+ in front seats; Age 8-15 in all seats	$10 for age 16+; $50 for age 8-15	84.0%
Montana	Secondary Enforcement	October 1, 1987	Age 6+ in all seats	$20	78.0%
Nebraska	Secondary Enforcement	January 1, 1993	Age 18+ in front seats	$25	85.9%
Nevada	Secondary Enforcement	July 1, 1987	Age 6+ in all seats	$25	90.6%
New Hampshire	None for adults, primary for minors only	August 18, 1997	Age 17 and under in all seats	$50	67.6%
New Jersey	Primary Enforcement^{4}	March 1, 1985	Age 8+ in all seats	$46 per person	94.1%
New Mexico	Primary Enforcement	January 1, 1986	Age 18+ in all seats	$25^{4}	91.5%
New York	Primary Enforcement	December 1, 1984	All ages in all seats	$50 ($135 actual after surcharges)	93.4%
North Carolina	Primary Enforcement, Secondary for back seat	October 1, 1985	All ages in all seats	$180 for front seat; $10 for rear seat; $266 for the driver if a passenger is under 16	91.4%
North Dakota	Secondary Enforcement^{3}	July 14, 1994	Age 18+ in front seats; Age under 18 in all seats	$20 for age 18+; $25 + 1 point on license for under 18^{4}	79.3%
Northern Mariana Islands	Primary Enforcement	—	Riders 6+ in age, in all seats	$25	92.2%
Ohio	Secondary Enforcement	May 6, 1986	Age 15+ in front seat; Age 8–14 in all seats	$30 for driver; $20 for passenger	82.8%
Oklahoma	Primary Enforcement	February 1, 1987	Age 13+ in front seats	$20	86.9%
Oregon	Primary Enforcement	December 7, 1990	All ages in all seats	$130	96.8%
Pennsylvania	Secondary Enforcement^{3}	November 23, 1987	Age 18+ in front seats; Age 8-17 in all seats	$10	85.6%
Puerto Rico	Primary Enforcement	—	Age 9+ or 57 inches and over; Seating unspecified	$50	87.9%
Rhode Island	Primary Enforcement	June 18, 1991	Age 8+ in all seats	$75	88.3%
South Carolina	Primary Enforcement	July 1, 1989	Age 6+ in all seats	$25	92.3%
South Dakota	Secondary Enforcement	January 1, 1995	Age 18+ in front seats	$25	74.8%
Tennessee	Primary Enforcement	April 21, 1986	Age 16+ in front seats	$25	88.5%
Texas	Primary Enforcement	September 1, 1985	Age 7 years and younger and 57 inches or taller in all seats; Age 8+ years in all seats	$200 if under 17 (driver); $50 if 15+ (driver or passenger)	91.9%
Utah	Primary Enforcement	April 28, 1986	All ages in all seats	$45	88.8%
Vermont	Secondary Enforcement^{3}	January 1, 1994	All ages in all seats	$25	84.5%
(United States Virgin Islands) Virgin Islands (U.S.)	Primary Enforcement	—	All ages in front seats	$25 – $250	79.1%
Virginia	Secondary Enforcement^{3}	January 1, 1988	All ages in all seats	$25	85.3%
Wake Island	Primary Enforcement	April 10, 2002	All ages	?	No data
(Washington (state)) Washington	Primary Enforcement	June 11, 1986	Age 8+ in all seats	$124	94.8%
West Virginia	Primary Enforcement	September 1, 1993	All ages in front seats; 8–17 in rear seats	$25	89.7%
Wisconsin	Primary Enforcement	December 1, 1987	Age 8+ in all seats	$10	89.4%
Wyoming	Secondary Enforcement	June 8, 1989	Age 9+ in all seats	$25 for driver; $10 for passenger	84.8%

Note: As of 2017, aggregate seat belt usage in road vehicles in the entire United States is 89.7%.

^{1} Arizona's law is Primary for under the age of 5.

^{2} Colorado and Missouri's law is Secondary for adults but Primary for those under the age of 16.

^{3} Idaho, North Dakota, Pennsylvania, Vermont and Virginia's law is Secondary for adults but Primary for under 18.

^{4} Kansas, Maryland, and New Jersey, law is Secondary Enforcement for rear seat occupants (18+ in Kansas).
^{5} These states assess points on one's driving record for the seat belt violation.
^{6} In California, an additional penalty of $29 shall be levied upon every $10 or fraction thereof, of every fine, penalty, or forfeiture imposed by and collected by the court for criminal offenses, including all traffic offenses, except parking offenses as defined in subdivision (i) of Penal Code § 1463. The additional penalty is calculated as follows: $10 state penalty required by PC 1464, $7 county penalty required by GC 76000(e), $5 court facilities construction penalty required by GC 70372(a), $5 DNA Identification Fund penalty required by GC 76104.6 and 76104.7, $2 emergency medical services penalty required by GC 76000.5. Separately, Penal Code § 1465.8 requires an imposition of an additional fee of $40 for court security on every conviction for a criminal offense, including a traffic offense, except parking offenses as defined in Penal Code § 1463. Additionally, GC 70373 requires a $35 criminal facilities conviction assessment.

== Damages reduction ==
A person involved in a car accident who was not using a seat belt may be liable for damages far greater than if they had been using a seat belt. However, when in court, most states protect motorists from having their damages reduced in a lawsuit due to the non-use of a seat belt, even if they were acting in violation of the law by not wearing the seat belt. Currently [when?], damages may be reduced for the non-use of a seat belt in 16 states: Alaska, Arizona, California, Colorado, Florida (See F.S.A. 316.614(10)), Iowa, Michigan, Missouri, Nebraska, New Jersey, New York, North Dakota, Ohio, Oregon, West Virginia, and Wisconsin.

== Effectiveness ==
Seat belt laws are effective in reducing car crash deaths. One study found that mandatory-seatbelt laws reduced traffic fatalities in youths by 8% and serious traffic-related injuries by 9%, respectively. Primary-seatbelt laws seem to be more effective at reducing crash deaths than secondary laws.

== See also ==
- Seat belt legislation
- Seat belt use rates in the United States
- Transportation safety in the United States
