= Clunk Click Every Trip =

British slogan promoting seatbelt use

"Clunk Click Every Trip" is the slogan of a series of British public information films. They commenced in the summer of 1970, presented by Shaw Taylor, then from January 1971 to 1975 were presented by Jimmy Savile.

The BBC adapted Savile's slogan for the title of his Saturday night variety show beginning in 1973. The slogan was introduced during the previous campaign, fronted by Taylor and featuring the slogan "Your seatbelt is their security". It was the onomatopoeia used by Taylor to describe the act of closing the door and fastening a seatbelt which proved the most memorable aspect of the campaign, so it was upgraded to act as the slogan when the films moved into colour.

The advertisements highlighted the dangers of traffic collisions and reminded drivers that the first thing they should do after closing the door ("Clunk") is fasten their seatbelt ("Click"). These advertisements, which included graphic sequences of drivers being thrown through the windscreen and, in one Savile-hosted public service announcement, an image of a disfigured woman who survived such an accident helped lay the groundwork for compulsory seatbelt use in the front seat of a vehicle, which came into force on 31 January 1983 in the UK, although car manufacturers had been legally obliged to fit front seatbelts since 1965.

In 2014, the National Archives quietly removed one of the films from a collection of public information films featured by the archive in 2006, as a result of Saville's sexual crimes coming to public notice.

== See also ==
- Seat belt legislation
- Click It or Ticket
