= Consumer Reports Best Buy Drugs =

Consumer Reports Best Buy Drugs is a United States public, grant-funded project of Consumer Reports Health that provides consumers unbiased information about prescription medicines. The project educates consumers on safe, effective, and low-cost alternatives to their prescription drugs. It aims to improve access to needed medicines for Americans who struggle to pay for their medications. Best Buy Drugs compares prescription drugs for common health conditions based on effectiveness, safety, and price, to help people talk to their doctors about the most effective and affordable medicines.

== History ==
The Consumer Reports Best Buy Drugs project was launched on December 9, 2004, to publish reports that combine evidence-based research on the Comparative Effectiveness and safety of prescription drugs with data on drug prices. The effectiveness data comes from the Drug Effectiveness Review Project (DERP) based at the Oregon Health & Science University Evidence-Based Practice Center. DERP uses physicians and researchers to evaluate the comparative effectiveness and safety of commonly used prescription drugs. None of the research teams have a financial interest in any pharmaceutical company or product. In addition to DERP’s effectiveness data, Best Buy Drugs layers in drug pricing information based on average retail prices paid by consumers at the pharmacy. The reports are peer-reviewed by medical experts in the particular drug category.

Best Buys are then chosen based on a drug’s effectiveness and safety, the side effects it may cause, how convenient it is to use, its track record in studies and use over time, and how much it costs relative to other drugs. There is no set formula for choosing Best Buys. Best Buys are chosen because they are: as effective as all the other drugs in the category, or more so; safe and cause no more—and usually fewer—side effects than other drugs in the category; and cost less on average than other drugs in the category. Several of the Best Buys have been chosen because of their superior effectiveness or safety profile even though they may cost more.

== Activities ==
The project publishes drug reports. The first three reports covered Statins to reduce high cholesterol, heartburn drugs, and NSAIDs commonly used to treat arthritis. The project covers over 20 conditions and the most widely used drugs. The reports are published in web versions and two-page PDF summaries in English and Spanish.

More than half of all prescription drugs cause adverse effects—some serious or fatal—that are not detected until after the U.S. Food and Drug Administration approves them, sometimes many years later. To highlight this concern, the doctors and editors of Best Buy Drugs publish drug-safety reports to draw attention to the adverse effects and risks of prescription drugs, such as Celebrex and Alli. The reports are created by the Best Buy Drugs team and an independent academic group, Research on Adverse Drug Events and Reports (RADAR), devoted to detecting drug safety issues. The project also reports on drugs prescribed off-label to highlight common off-label uses, evaluates the clinical evidence and safety information for those uses, and makes recommendations to help consumers decide whether or not the off-label use is right for them.

Best Buy Drugs has reached out to physicians, pharmacists, and senior and low-income groups to help ensure the information gets into their hands. The initial outreach campaign launched in Atlanta and Sacramento in 2005 and expanded to California, Georgia, and other states later in 2005. Groups that have partnered with Best Buy Drugs include the American Public Health Association, the Alliance for Retired Americans, the National Committee to Preserve Social Security and Medicare, and the American Medical School Association. More recently, the project has partnered with AARP, National Urban League, National Association of Area Agencies on Aging (N4A), National Center on Black Aged and MGH Institute of Health Professions.

== See also ==
- Drug safety
- Generic drugs
- Pill splitting
- Prescription costs
- Prescription drug prices in the United States
