= Seat belt use rates in the United States =

U.S. MUTCD seat belt symbol

Seat belt use rates in the United States have been rising steadily since 1983, from 14% to 90% in 2016. Seat belt use in the country in 2016 ranged from a minimum of 70.2% in New Hampshire to a maximum of 96.9% in Georgia. 19 states had use rates above 90%.

According to the National Highway Traffic Safety Administration's (NHTSA) 2008 survey, seat belt use remained lower among 16- to 24-year-olds than other age groups, with a rate of 77%, and also was lower among African Americans than other races, with a use rate of 75%. The survey also found that seat belt use continued to be higher among females (86%) than males (79%).

According to the NHTSA's 2013 survey, seat belt use in jurisdictions with stronger seatbelt enforcement laws continue to exhibit generally higher use rates than those with weaker laws.

== Seat belt usage by year ==
The following list shows the national percentage of vehicle occupants using seat belts between 1983 and 2017:

Historical seat belt use in the United States 1983-2017
Year	%	Year	%	Year	%
2017	89.7	2005	82	1993	66
2016	90.1	2004	80	1992	62
2015	88.5	2003	79	1991	59
2014	86.7	2002	75	1990	49
2013	87	2001	73	1989	46
2012	86	2000	71	1988	45
2011	84	1999	67	1987	42
2010	85	1998	65	1986	37
2009	84	1997	69	1985	21
2008	83	1996	61	1984	14
2007	82	1995	68	1983	14
2006	81	1994	58		

The only years in which the rate did not increase over the previous year were 1994 when usage fell by eight percent, 1996 when usage fell by seven percent, 2006 when usage fell by one percent, and 2017 when usage fell by four tenths of one percent.

== Seat belt usage by state/territory ==
Seat belt Usage by State 2003-2012 (%)
STATE	2003	2004	2005	2006	2007	2008	2009	2010	2011	2012	2013
Alabama	77.40	80.00	81.80	82.90	82.30	86.10	90.00	91.40	88.00	88.9	97.3
Alaska	78.90	76.70	78.40	83.20	82.40	84.90	86.10	86.80	89.30	88.1	86.1
Arizona	86.20	95.30	94.20	78.90	80.90	79.90	80.80	81.80	82.90	82.2	84.7
Arkansas	62.80	64.20	68.30	69.30	69.90	70.40	74.40	78.30	78.40	71.9	76.7
California	91.20	90.40	92.50	93.40	94.60	95.70	95.30	96.20	96.60	95.5	97.4
Colorado	77.70	79.30	79.20	80.30	81.10	81.70	81.10	82.90	82.10	80.7	82.1
Connecticut	78.00	82.90	81.60	83.50	85.80	88.00	85.90	88.20	88.40	86.8	86.6
Delaware	74.90	82.30	83.80	86.10	86.60	91.30	88.40	90.70	90.30	87.9	92.2
District of Columbia	84.90	87.10	88.80	85.40	87.10	90.00	93.00	92.30	95.20	92.4	87.5
Florida	72.60	76.30	73.90	80.70	79.10	81.70	85.20	87.40	88.10	87.4	87.2
Georgia	84.50	86.70	89.90	90.00	89.00	89.60	88.90	89.60	93.00	93.4	95.5
Hawaii	91.80	95.10	95.30	92.50	97.60	97.00	97.90	97.60	96.00	93.4	94.0
Idaho	71.70	74.00	76.00	79.80	78.50	76.90	79.20	77.90	79.10	79.0	81.6
Illinois	80.10	83.00	86.00	87.80	90.10	90.50	91.70	92.60	92.90	93.6	93.7
Indiana	82.30	83.40	81.20	84.30	87.90	91.20	92.60	92.40	93.20	93.6	91.6
Iowa	86.80	86.40	87.10	89.60	91.30	92.90	93.10	93.10	93.50	93.6	91.9
Kansas	63.60	68.30	69.00	73.50	75.00	77.40	77.00	81.80	82.90	79.5	80.7
Kentucky	65.50	66.00	66.70	67.20	71.80	73.30	79.70	80.30	82.20	83.7	85.0
Louisiana	73.80	75.00	77.70	74.80	75.20	75.50	74.50	75.90	77.70	79.3	82.5
Maine	N/A	72.30	75.80	77.20	79.80	83.00	82.60	82.00	81.60	84.4	83.0
Maryland	87.90	89.00	91.10	91.10	93.10	93.30	94.00	94.70	94.20	91.1	90.7
Massachusetts	61.70	63.30	64.80	66.90	68.70	66.80	73.60	73.70	73.20	72.7	74.8
Michigan	84.80	90.50	92.90	94.30	93.70	97.20	98.00	95.20	94.50	93.6	93.0
Minnesota	79.40	82.10	83.90	83.30	87.80	86.70	90.20	92.30	92.70	93.6	94.8
Mississippi	62.20	63.20	60.80	73.60	71.80	71.30	76.00	81.00	81.90	83.2	74.4
Missouri	72.90	75.90	77.40	75.20	77.20	75.80	77.20	76.00	79.00	79.4	80.1
Montana	79.50	80.90	80.00	79.00	79.60	79.30	79.20	78.90	76.90	76.3	74.0
Nebraska	76.10	79.20	79.20	76.00	78.70	82.60	84.80	84.10	84.20	78.6	79.1
Nevada	78.70	86.60	94.80	91.20	92.20	90.90	91.00	93.20	94.10	90.5	94.8
New Hampshire	49.60	N/A	N/A	63.50	63.80	69.20	68.90	72.20	75.00	68.6	73.0
New Jersey	81.20	82.00	86.00	90.00	91.40	91.80	92.70	93.70	94.50	88.3	91.0
New Mexico	87.20	89.70	89.50	89.60	91.50	91.10	90.10	89.80	90.50	91.4	92.0
New York	84.60	85.00	85.00	83.00	83.50	89.10	88.00	89.80	90.50	90.4	91.1
North Carolina	86.10	86.10	86.70	88.50	88.80	89.80	89.50	89.70	89.50	87.5	88.6
North Dakota	63.70	67.40	76.30	79.00	82.20	81.60	81.50	74.80	76.70	80.9	77.7
Ohio	74.70	74.10	78.70	81.70	81.60	82.70	83.60	83.80	84.10	82.0	84.5
Oklahoma	76.70	80.30	83.10	83.70	83.10	84.30	84.20	85.90	85.90	83.8	83.6
Oregon	90.40	92.60	93.30	94.10	95.30	96.30	96.60	97.00	96.60	96.8	98.2
Pennsylvania	79.00	81.80	83.30	86.30	86.70	85.10	87.90	86.00	83.80	83.5	84.0
Rhode Island	74.20	76.20	74.70	74.00	79.10	72.00	74.70	78.00	80.40	77.5	85.6
South Carolina	72.80	65.70	69.70	72.50	74.50	79.00	81.50	85.40	86.00	90.50	
South Dakota	69.90	69.40	68.80	71.30	73.00	71.80	72.10	74.50	73.40	66.5	69.7
Tennessee	68.50	72.00	74.40	78.60	80.20	81.50	80.60	87.10	87.40	83.7	84.8
Texas	84.30	83.20	89.90	90.40	91.80	91.20	92.90	93.80	93.70	94.0	90.3
Utah	85.20	85.70	86.90	88.60	86.80	86.00	86.10	89.00	89.20	81.9	82.4
Vermont	82.40	79.90	84.70	82.40	87.10	87.30	85.30	85.20	84.70	84.2	84.9
Virginia	74.60	79.90	80.40	78.70	79.90	80.60	82.30	80.50	81.80	78.4	79.7
Washington	94.80	94.20	95.20	96.30	96.40	96.50	96.40	97.60	97.50	96.9	94.5
West Virginia	73.60	75.80	84.90	88.50	89.60	89.50	87.00	82.10	84.90	84.0	82.2
Wisconsin	69.80	72.40	73.30	75.40	75.30	74.20	73.80	79.20	79.00	79.9	82.4
Wyoming	N/A	70.10	N/A	63.50	72.20	68.60	67.60	78.90	82.60	77.0	81.9

== See also ==
- Seat belt use rates by country
- Transportation safety in the United States
