= Zillions (magazine) =

Financial magazine for children

Zillions, originally titled Penny Power, was a children's magazine published by the Consumers Union, the publisher of Consumer Reports. Founded in 1980, at its peak, the magazine covered close to 350,000 subscribers.

It gave children financial advice for budgeting their allowances and saving for a big purchase, reviewed kid-oriented consumer products (e.g., toys, clothes, electronics, food, videogames, etc.), and generally promoted smart consumerism in kids and teens; testing of products came from kids of the age range a product was targeted toward. It also taught kids about deceitful marketing practices practiced by advertising agencies. While children asked questions, suggested topics to cover, and helped product test, the editorial staff was made up of adults with experience in children's media, including Mad magazine, and in home economics. In one article, the magazine said children were exposed to 3,000 ads a day. The magazine did not run any advertisements. It changed its name from Penny Power to Zillions because penny suggested its readers had limited consumer power.

A 1982 review of the magazine praised its child appeal and value as a teaching tool in schools. There were also TV specials that ran on PBS and HBO. The print version of the magazine, which only broke even, was ended in 2000 by new leadership at the Consumers Union. An online version continued for two years with new interactive polls and archived articles from the print magazine at Zillions.org, finally discontinuing in 2007.
