= Mountain View, Colorado =

Town in Colorado, United States

- Home rule town
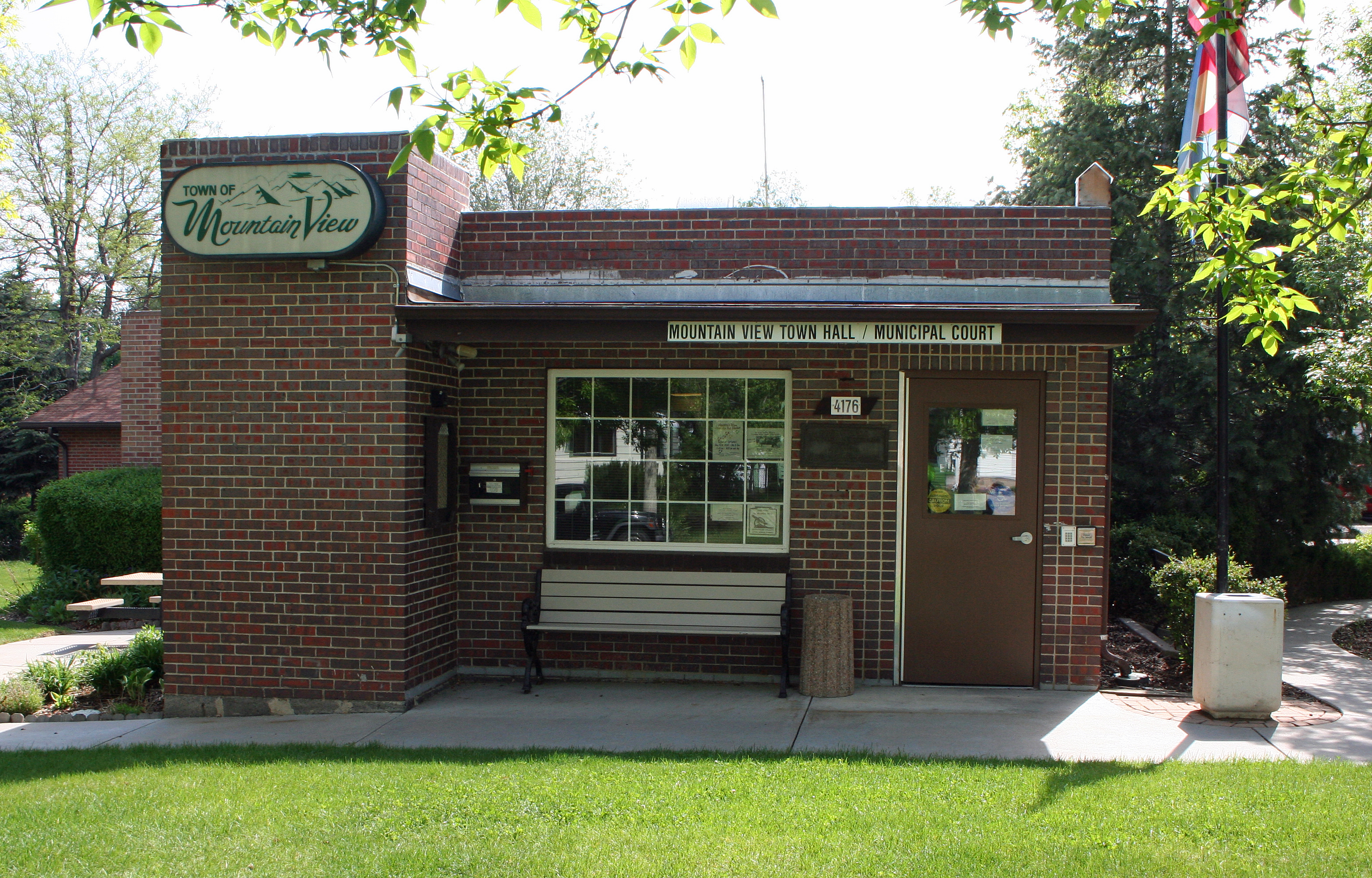
- Mountain View Town Hall and Municipal Court

- Location of Mountain View in Jefferson County, Colorado
- Coordinates: 39°46′29″N 105°03′24″W
- Country: United States
- State: Colorado
- County: Jefferson
- Settled: 1879
- Platted: 1888
- Incorporated: October 11, 1904

Government
  - Type: Home rule municipality

Area
  - Total: 0.093 sq mi (0.24 km^{2})
  - Land: 0.093 sq mi (0.24 km^{2})
  - Water: 0 sq mi (0.00 km^{2})
- Elevation: 5,384 ft (1,641 m)

Population (2020)
  - Total: 541
  - Density: 5,800/sq mi (2,300/km^{2})
- Time zone: UTC-7 (MST)
  - Summer (DST): UTC-6 (MDT)
- ZIP code: Denver 80212
- Area codes: Both 303 and 720
- FIPS code: 08-52350
- GNIS feature ID: 2413021
- Website: www.tomv.org

The Town of Mountain View is a home rule municipality located in Jefferson County, Colorado, United States. Mountain View is situated west of, and adjacent to, the city and county of Denver. As of the 2020 census, the population of Mountain View was 541. The Denver Post Office (ZIP Code 80212) serves Mountain View.

== History ==
Mountain View was incorporated in 1904 on the land occupied by the Berkeley Annex subdivision established in 1888, which itself was part of the Berkeley Farm founded by John Brisben Walker in 1879.

The town grew to approximately 500 residents living in 272 houses by 2008, with approximately 20 businesses in operation, but occupying a total of only 12 square blocks "sandwiched between Wheat Ridge and Denver."

By 2009, several businesses had closed down, sales taxes declined, and city workers were paid late on three occasions over two months. The town council added a US$162 fee to sewer bills in order to maintain basic services. The Colorado state government stepped in to pay for getting the city's financial records in order. The town wrote a letter to its residents saying, "'Our town is in serious trouble and we need your help!' [offering] three options: Get some more businesses into town, unincorporate and be absorbed into Jefferson County or let a neighboring community annex the town."

== Geography ==
Mountain View is located on the eastern edge of Jefferson County and is bordered to the north by Lakeside, to the west and south by Wheat Ridge, and to the east by Denver.

According to the United States Census Bureau, Mountain View has a total area of 0.09 square miles (0.24 km^{2}), covering 12 square blocks, all of it land.

== Demographics ==
Historical population
Census	Pop.	Note	%±
1910	390		—
1920	372		−4.6%
1930	664		78.5%
1940	711		7.1%
1950	878		23.5%
1960	826		−5.9%
1970	706		−14.5%
1980	584		−17.3%
1990	550		−5.8%
2000	569		3.5%
2010	507		−10.9%
2020	541		6.7%
U.S. Decennial Census

== Economy ==
As of 2024, Mountain View relies primarily on tax revenue from the three dispensaries within the 12 square blocks of town. In 2023 the Colorado Department of Revenue reported that Jefferson County, which includes the Town of Mountain View, did over $5.3 million in retail marijuana sales, and reported $837,027 in the state share of retail marijuana sales tax. Mountain View's Mayor, Emilie Mitcham, said the following about the 2023 town budget: "We’re lucky to have healthy sales tax revenue, with roughly half of our sales tax income coming from the three dispensaries in town, and the other half from the remaining businesses. Even after necessary salary increases, as well as substantial increases in health insurance spending (we cover 100 percent of the premiums for employees and their dependents), our financial situation is strong. We spend less than we bring in, each year. Fiscally, we are well protected in the event of any unexpected downturn or calamity."

With its land area of only 12 square blocks, Mountain View previously had a tiny retail sales tax base from which to raise revenue and relied primarily on traffic tickets to pay its police and municipal employees.

The town called an emergency meeting on March 2, 2009, to get input on its future. The town sent a letter to all residents stating that it faced a growing debt crisis, with a budget shortfall between six and eight thousand dollars a month. The letter stated that its police officers had been paid late three times in the last two months, 40 percent of the town's businesses had closed, and that it had petitioned the Attorney General of Colorado to use DEA seizure money to pay police department salaries, which was declined in May 2009.

The letter proposed imposing additional fees for police services and even streetlights, noting in its last sentence that being annexed into a neighboring community was one possible outcome of the fiscal crisis.

== Community events ==
In 2022, after Mayor Emilie Mitcham was elected into office, she issued a Mayor's letter stating the following about community events in Mountain View: "You may have noticed that we’re having more town events these days. The events are designed to create community and encourage neighbors to get to know each other. But there are other benefits as well. They are really good opportunities to interact with your police officers and your elected officials. They create many low-key, entertaining ways to build relationships, thereby making it easier to stay engaged in the business of your town."

Since then, a variety of community events have been hosted in Mountain View: - National Night Out - Annual Town Picnic - Annual Spring Fling - Outdoor Movie Night - Santa Visit and Toy Drive

== Police department history and ticketing ==
In 2014, The Mountain View Police Department was criticized for its overuse of issuing citations for menial traffic violations. Officers have frequently issued tickets for such violations as cracked windshields or objects such as air fresheners hanging from rearview mirrors. In 2013, the department issued more citations than the cities of Denver, Aurora, and Boulder, combined. Nearly half of the town's revenue comes from court fees and citations, according to its 2014 budget. A typical "obstructed view" citation alone can run someone $80, which includes a $30 surcharge. It is alleged that the excessive enforcement of these laws is motivated to raise revenues for the police department, a force with only nine full-time or part-time officers.

In 2014, the Mountain View Police Department was mentioned in a "Best of the Worst" piece on Reason TV, pointing out that Mountain View police fund their own jobs in part by over-ticketing out-of-town motorists for obstructed view citations.

Mountain View PD was again featured in a 2015 interview with 9NEWS KUSA reporter Jeremy Jojola following an investigation by 9NEWS of all 270 Colorado municipalities with respect to budgets and police ticketing of motorists. In 2014, Mountain View brought in 53 percent of total town revenue from police tickets. Mountain View issues tickets for the primary enforcement of a seat-belt violations in addition to the "obstructed view" violations previously mentioned.

== See also ==
- Denver-Aurora-Broomfield, CO Metropolitan Statistical Area
