= Drug Effectiveness Review Project =

The Drug Effectiveness Review Project (DERP) is a self-governed collaboration of state Medicaid and public pharmacy programs that commission high-quality evidence-based research products to assist policymakers and other decision-makers grappling with difficult drug coverage decisions. Housed at the Center for Evidence-based Policy at Oregon Health & Science University in Portland, Oregon, DERP produces concise, comparative, evidence-based research products that evaluate the efficacy, effectiveness, and safety of drugs in many widely used drug classes.

Nationally recognized for its clinical objectivity and high-quality research, DERP focuses on specialty and other high-impact drugs – particularly those that have potential to change clinical practice. The program's goal is to ultimately help improve appropriate patient access, safety, and quality of care while helping government programs contain exploding costs for new pharmaceutical therapies. DERP uses a collaborative governing model to develop work plans that provide independent and objective research on drug effectiveness and safety to bring evidence to health policy decisions.

DERP reports include up-to-date clinical evidence on efficacy, adverse events, and safety information for the drugs reviewed. These reports and research products are not usage guidelines, nor should they be read as an endorsement of or recommendation for any particular drug, use or approach. Rather, DERP reports are used by policy makers to develop criteria for drug coverage, such as prior authorizations, clinical edits, drug utilization management policies, and provider or patient education materials. DERP research products include a comprehensive search of the global evidence, an objective appraisal of the quality of the studies found, and a thorough synthesis of high-quality evidence. Policymakers are able to use these reports and research products to make informed policy decisions that improve patient outcomes and contain costs.

== Sources ==
- Neumann, P. J. (2006). "Emerging Lessons from the Drug Effectiveness Review Project". Health Affairs. 25 (4): W262 – W271. doi:10.1377/hlthaff.25.w262. PMID 16757486.
- Donohue, J. M.; Fischer, M. A.; Huskamp, H. A.; Weissman, J. S. (2008). "Potential Savings from an Evidence-Based Consumer-Oriented Public Education Campaign on Prescription Drugs". Health Services Research. 43 (5p1): 1557–1575. doi:10.1111/j.1475-6773.2008.00858.x. PMC 2653882. PMID 18479406.
