= Seat belt legislation =

Laws requiring fitting and wearing of seat belts in motor vehicles

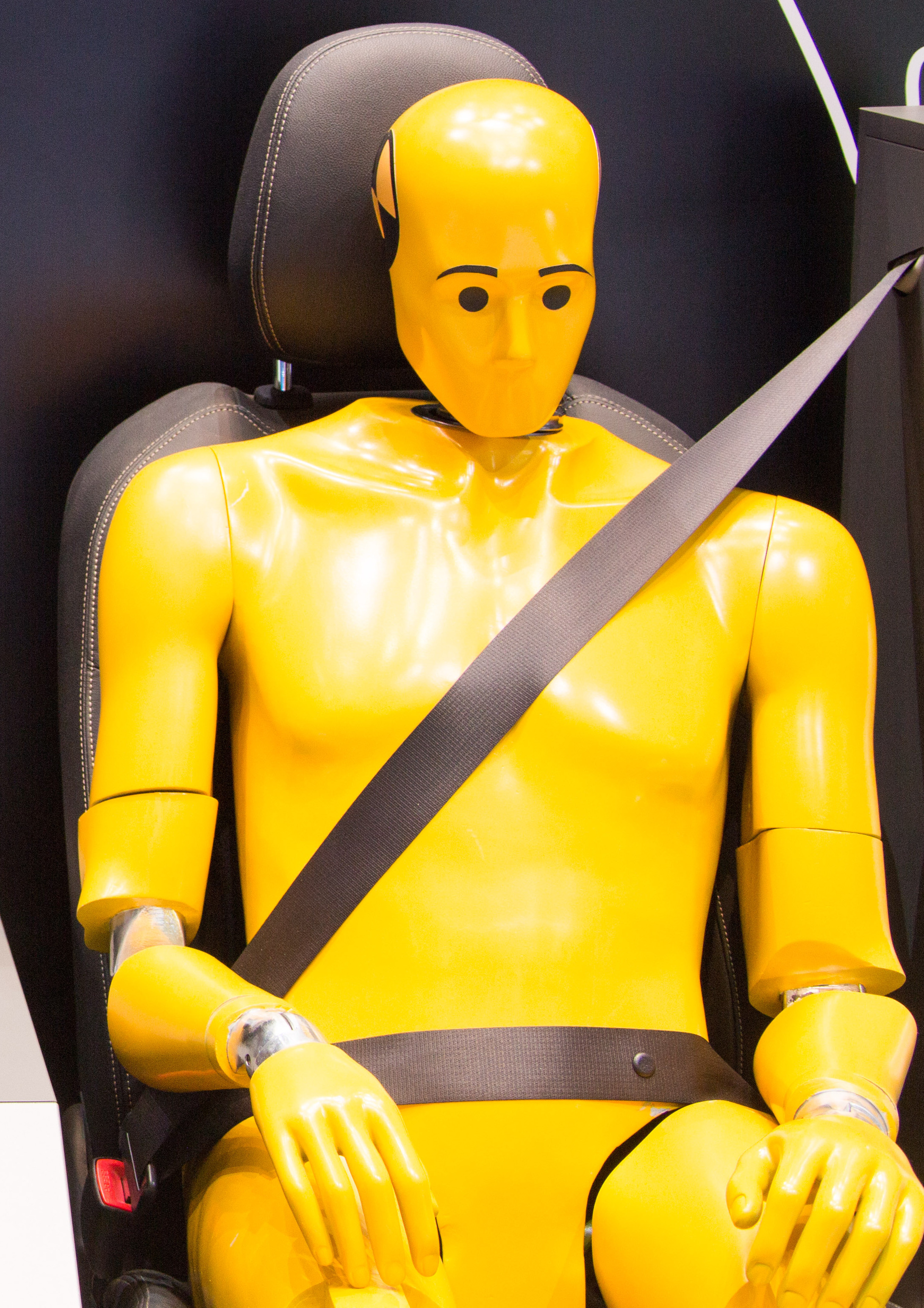
Crash test dummy with a three-point seat belt

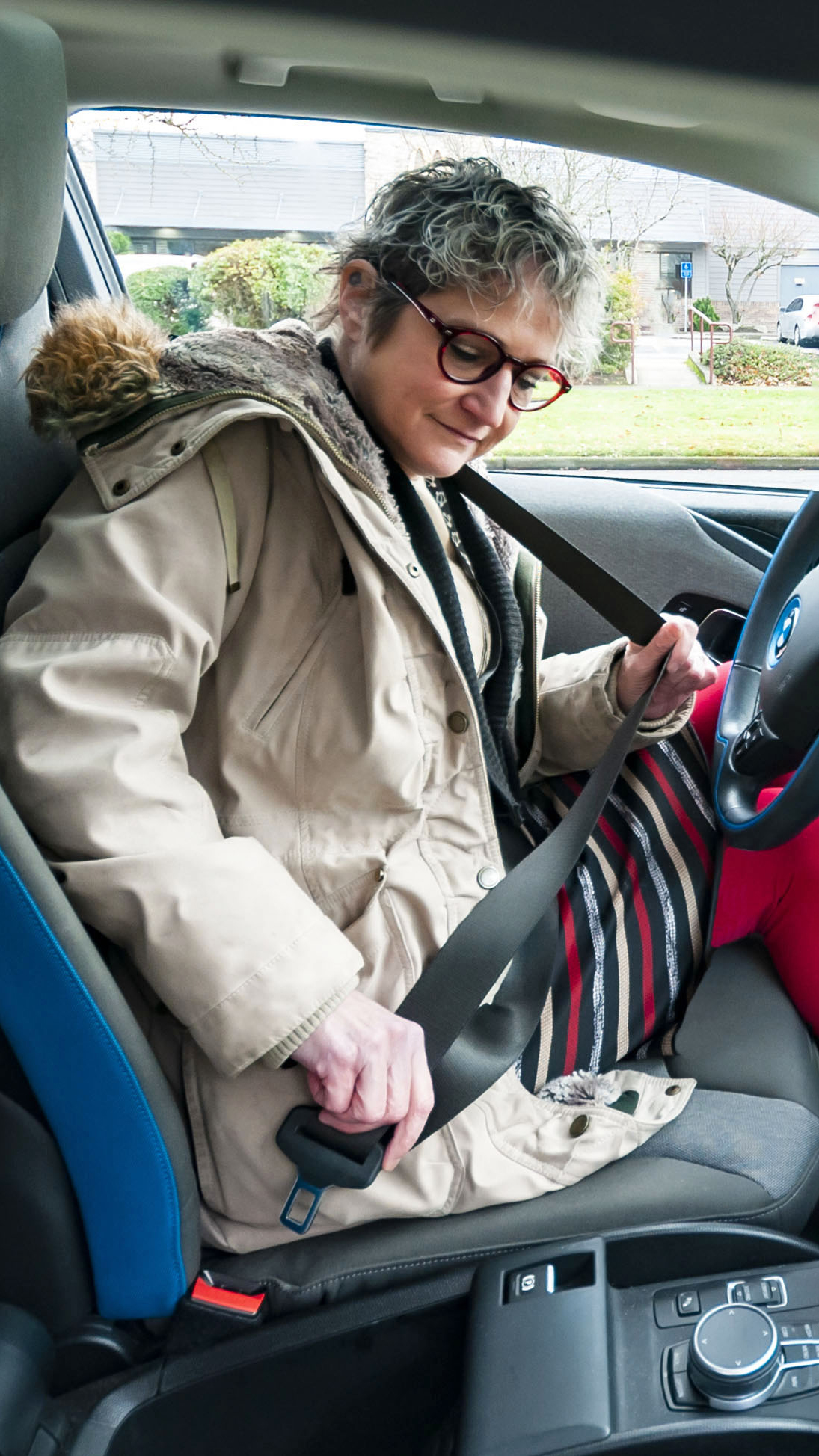
Buckling a three-point seat belt

Seat belt legislation requires the fitting of seat belts to motor vehicles and the wearing of seat belts by motor vehicle occupants to be mandatory. Laws requiring the fitting of seat belts to cars have in some cases been followed by laws mandating their use, with the effect that thousands of deaths on the road have been prevented. Different laws apply in different countries to the wearing of seat belts.

== National comparisons ==
=== Australia ===
In Australia, after the introduction of mandatory front outboard mounting points in 1964, the use of seat belts by all vehicle passengers was made compulsory in the states of Victoria and South Australia in 1970 and 1971, respectively. By 1973, the use of fitted seat belts by vehicle occupants was made compulsory for the rest of Australia and some other countries during the 1970s and 1980s. The subsequent dramatic decline in road deaths is generally because of seat belt laws and subsequent road safety campaigns. Seat belts are not required for bus occupants unless fitted, reversing drivers, and those driving some slow-moving vehicles. The laws for these differ depending on the state or territory with jurisdiction.

=== Canada ===
All provinces in Canada have primary enforcement seat belt laws. In 1976, Ontario was the first province to pass a law which required vehicle occupants to wear seat belts.

=== Switzerland ===
In 1976, the Swiss government required seat belts to be worn in the front seats of vehicles. The measure was overturned by the Supreme Court in 1977. On 30 November 1980, the issue of compulsory seat belt use in the front seats was put to a referendum. The law was accepted with 52 % of the people who voted. In 1994, seat belts became compulsory in the rear seats of vehicles, this time without significant resistance.

=== United Kingdom ===
In the United Kingdom, seat belts must be worn at all times, by all passengers, if they are fitted to a vehicle unless reversing. Passengers may be exempt from wearing a seat belt for various exceptions, such as medical reasons. Since September 18, 2006, children travelling in the UK must also use an appropriate child seat in addition to the standard seat belt, unless they are 12 years old or have reached at least 135 centimetres (53 in) in height, whichever is first.

In the UK, a requirement for anchorage points was introduced in 1965, followed by the requirement in 1968 to fit three-point belts in the front outboard positions on all new cars and all existing cars back to 1965. Successive UK governments proposed, but failed to deliver, seat belt legislation throughout the 1970s. Front seat belts were compulsory equipment on all new cars registered in the UK from 1968, although it did not become compulsory for them to be worn until 1983. Rear seat belts were compulsory equipment from 1986 and it became compulsory for them to be worn in 1991. However, it has never been a legal requirement for cars registered before those dates to be fitted with seat belts. In one such attempt in 1979 similar claims for potential lives and injuries saved were advanced. William Rodgers, then Secretary of State for Transport in the Callaghan Labour Government (1976–1979), stated: "On the best available evidence of accidents in this country – evidence which has not been seriously contested – compulsion could save up to 1000 lives and 10,000 injuries a year."

=== United States ===
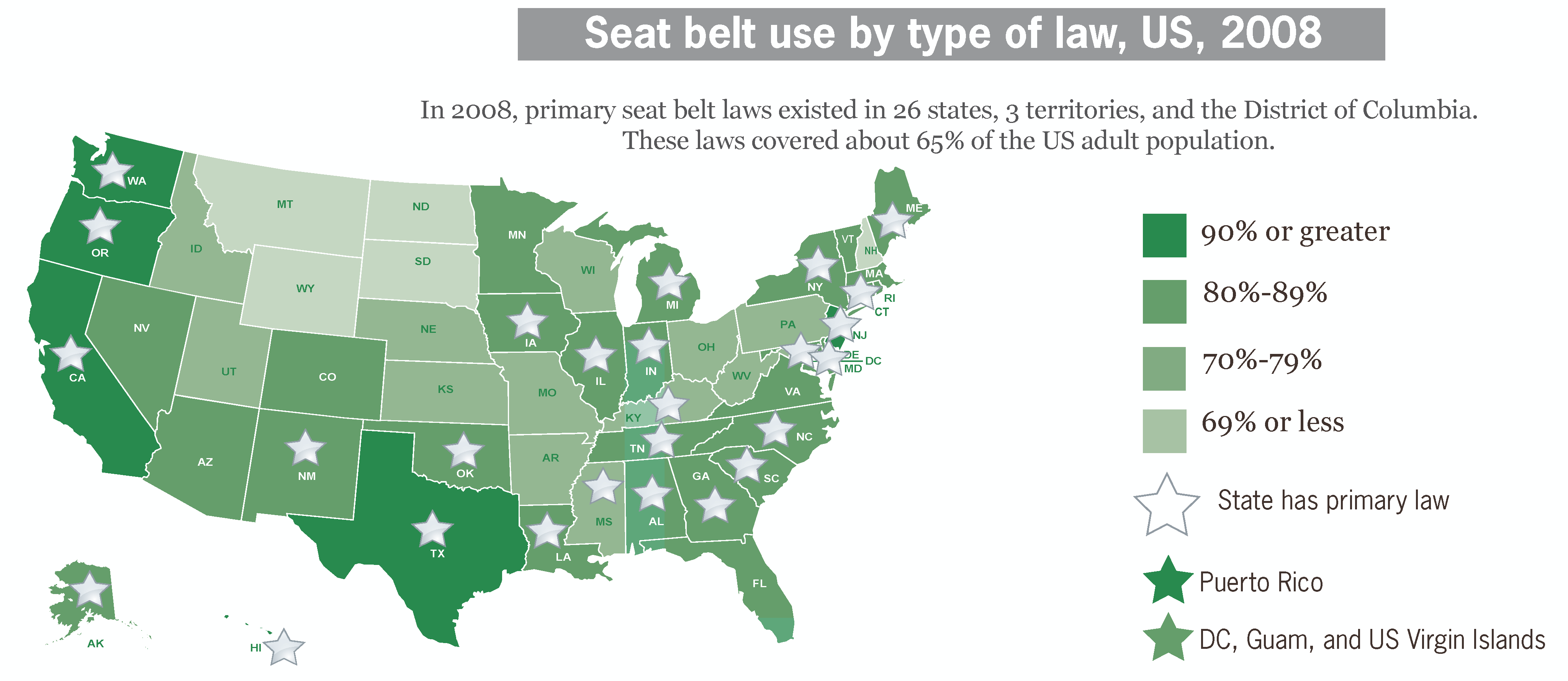
Seat belt use by type of law in the US, 2008

In the United States, seat belt legislation varies by state. The state of Wisconsin introduced legislation in 1961 requiring seat belts to be fitted to the front outboard seat positions of cars. Seat belts have been mandatory equipment since the 1968 model year per Federal Motor Vehicle Safety Standard 208.

New York State passed the first law in the US mandating the use of seat belts in 1984 under the leadership of John D. States, an orthopedic surgeon who dedicated his career to improving automotive safety. Depending on which state a driver is in, not wearing a seat belt in the front seat is either a primary offense or a secondary offense, with the exception of New Hampshire, which does not have a law requiring people over age 18 to wear a seat belt. In the front seat, the driver and each passenger must wear a seat belt, one person per belt. In some states, such as New Hampshire, Michigan, Arkansas, and Missouri, belts in the rear seats are not mandatory for people over the age of 16.

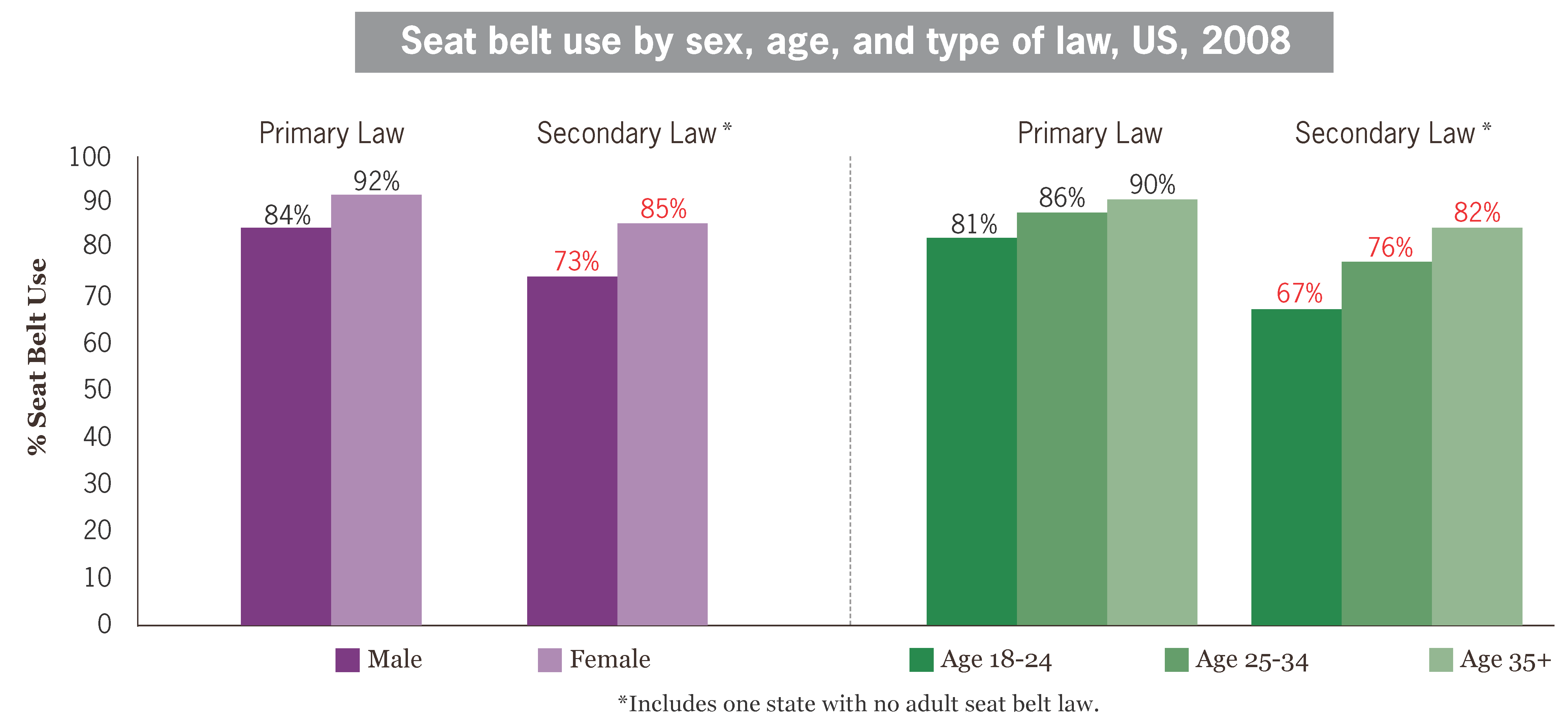
Seat belt use by sex, age, and type of law in the US, 2008

A primary offense means that a police officer can pull a driver over for the seat belt law violation alone, and secondary offense indicates that one can be punished for a seat belt law violation only if they are already pulled over for another reason. By January 2007 25 states and the District of Columbia had primary seat belt laws, 24 had secondary seat belt laws, and New Hampshire had no laws. Some states determine whether to enforce failure to wear a seat belt as a primary or secondary offense depending on whether the unrestrained person is in the front or back of the car. Kansas, Maryland, and New Jersey enforce failure to wear a seat belt as a driver or front-seat passenger as a primary offense and failure to wear a seat belt as a rear seat passenger as a secondary offense. In 2009, Public Health Law Research published several evidence briefs summarizing the research assessing the effect of a specific law or policy on public health. One stated, "Safety belt laws work, but there is strong evidence to support that primary enforcement safety belt laws are more effective than secondary enforcement laws in increasing seat belt use and reducing crash injuries."

Another found that "there is strong evidence that enhanced seat belt enforcement interventions can substantially increase seat belt use and its associated benefits."

=== European Union ===
In the European Union, seat belts were only mandatory in vehicles under 3.5 tonnes until a 2003 directive made them mandatory in all vehicles in 2006. The directive also clarifies that seat belts are to be used for children and makes it mandatory to deactivate airbags for the use of rear-facing child restraints. Some exemptions exist for five members states: Belgium, Denmark, France, Sweden, and Spain.

=== Developing countries ===
In many developing countries, pedestrians, cyclists, rickshaw operators and moped users represent the majority of road users.

In India, all cars manufactured after March 25, 1994, are equipped with front seat belts. The rule was extended for rear seats in 2002. The usage of seat belts is to be implemented by the respective states, with most states making seat belt usage for front seat passengers mandatory in 2002. Older vehicles that did not originally have seat belts were exempted. However, enforcement is weak in most parts of the country.

In Indonesia, belts are mandatory only for front seats. Many low-entry car models are not equipped with rear seat belts.

In Malaysia, the first stage of safety belt laws was implemented in 1979. This was expanded in January 2009 to include rear passengers. Passenger vehicles registered prior to January 1, 1995, and those weighing more than 3.5 tons are exempted from this rule. The third and fourth stages, which will deal with baby and child seats and the number of passengers in a vehicle, have not taken effect.

In the Philippines, a seat belt law, Republic Act No. 8750, was approved on August 5, 1999. The law took effect in 2000 and requires all public and private vehicles, except motorcycles and tricycles, to have their front seats equipped with seat belts. Front seats as defined by the law includes the first row of seats behind the driver for public utility buses. Those below the age of six are prohibited to occupy the front seats of motor vehicles even if wearing a seat belt. Jeepneys are only required to have lap belts for the front seat passengers and the driver.

== Overview of seat belt legislation by country ==
The table below gives an overview of when seat belt legislation was first introduced in different countries. It includes both regional and national legislation.

| Country | Compulsory wearing | | | | Compulsory fitting | | Source |
| Country | Cars | | | Bus passengers | Cars | Buses Trucks | Source |
| Country | Driver | Front passengers | Rear passengers | Bus passengers | Cars | Buses Trucks | Source |
|---|---|---|---|---|---|---|---|
| Argentina | 1994 | | | | 1994 | 1994 (First row only, all in school buses) | |
| Australia | 1970 (Victoria), 1971 (SA, NSW), 1972 (national), 1986 (child restraints) | | | | 1969, 1970 (back seat, Victoria) 1971 (back seat) | 1983 (≤3.5 tonnes) | |
| China | 1993 | 1993 | 2014 | | 1993 (Front Seat) 2004 (Rear Seats) | | |
| Canada | 1976 (Ontario, then Quebec) | | | | | | |
| Czech Republic | 1966 (outside cities); 1990 (all) | | 1976; 1990 | 2004 | 1968 | | |
| European Union | 1993/1991 | | 2006 | 2003 | | 1997 | |
| Finland | 1975, 1982 fines given | 1975 over 15 years old passenger, 1982 all and fines given | 1987, 1994 taxi passengers | 2006 | 1971 (front seat) 1981 (back seat) | | |
| France | 1973 (outside cities), 1975 (cities at night), 1979 (all) | | 1990 | 2003 | 1967, 1978 (back seat) | 2003 | |
| Germany | 1976 | | 1984 | 1999 | 1970, 1979 (back seat) | 1999 | Angurtpflicht |
| Hungary | 1976 | | 1993 | | | | |
| Hong Kong | 1983 | 1983 | 1996 (private cars) 2001 (taxis) | 2004 (minibuses, where available); 2026 (buses, where available; suspended) | 1996 (back seat) | 2004 (minibuses); July 2018 (buses) | |
| India | 1999 | 2019 | 2024† | | 1994 (front seats), 2002 (rear seats) | | |
| Ireland | 1979 | | 1992 | | 1971 (front seats), 1992 (rear seats) | | |
| Israel | 1973 | | 1990 | 2006‡ | 1967 (front seats); 1983 (back seats) | 2006 | |
| Italy | 1989 | | 1990 (where available) | 2006‡ | 1988 (new vehicles); 1989 (all*, front seats); 1990 (new vehicles, back seats); 2000 (all*, back seats) | 2006 | |
| Japan | 1971† (1985) | 1971 (no fines), 1985 (fines on freeway), 1993 (all) | 2008 | 2008 | 1969 | | |
| Myanmar | 2017 | 2017 | 2017 | 2016 (motorway buses enforced) | | | |
| Netherlands | 1976 | | 1992 | | 1975 (front) 1990 (rear) | | |
| New Zealand | 1972 | 1972 (15 years and over), 1979 (8 years and over) | By 1989 | | 1972 (vehicles registered after 1965), 1975 (after 1955) | | |
| Philippines | 2000 (those below 6 years prohibited to occupy front seats) | | | 2000 (first row beside the driver's seat only) | 2000 | | |
| Russia | 1993 | | | | | 2010 | |
| Singapore | 1973 | 1973 | 1993 | 2008 (small buses) | 1973 | | |
| Spain | 1975 | 1975 | 1992 | | | | |
| Sri Lanka | 2011 | 2011 | | | | | |
| Sweden | 1975 | | 1986 | 1999 | 1970 | 2004 (except for city buses) | |
| Switzerland | 1981 | | 1994 | | 1971 | 1998 | |
| Thailand | 1996 | | 2009 | | | | |
| United Kingdom | 1983 | | 1991 | 2006 | 1967 (front) 1987 (rear) | 2001 (except buses designed for urban use with standing passengers) | |
| United States | 1984 (New York; seat belt use law is jurisdiction of individual states) | | | | Wisconsin, 1961. Federally, front lap 1965 model year; front shoulder & rear lap 1968; 3-point front 1974 | | |
| Nepal | 1993 (Introduced by section 130 (1) of Vehicle and Transport Management Act, 1993) | | | | | | |

* - actually only vehicles registered after 15 June 1976; in previous registered vehicles fitting is optional
† - required by the law, but no penalty for violation at the time
‡ - required by the law, but low enforcement

== Effects ==
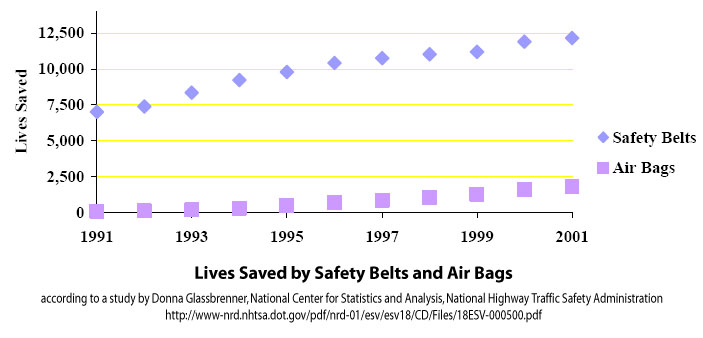
Lives saved by seat belts and airbags in the United States (1991–2001)

Studies by road safety authorities conclude that seat belt legislation has reduced the number of casualties in road accidents.

Experiments using both crash test dummies and human cadavers also indicated that wearing seat belts should lead to reduced risk of death and injury in car crashes.

Studies of accident outcomes suggest that fatality rates among car occupants are reduced by between 30 and 50 percent if seat belts are worn. The US National Highway Traffic Safety Administration (NHTSA) estimates that death risks for a driver wearing a lap-shoulder seat belt are reduced by 48 percent. The same study indicated that in 2007, an estimated 15,147 lives were saved by seat belts in the United States and that if seat belt use were increased to 100 percent, an additional 5024 lives would have been saved.

An earlier statistical analysis by the NHTSA claimed that seat belts save over 10,000 lives every year in the US.

According to a more recent fact sheet produced by the NHTSA:

"In 2012, seat belts saved an estimated 12,174 lives among passenger vehicle occupants 5 and older. [...] Research has found that lap/shoulder seat belts, when used, reduce the risk of fatal injury to front-seat passenger car occupants by 45% and the risk of moderate-to-critical injury by 50%. [...] Research on the effectiveness of child safety seats has found them to reduce the risk of fatal injury by 71% for infants (younger than 1 year old) and by 54% for toddlers (1 to 4 years old) in passenger cars."

By 2009, despite large increases in population and the number of vehicles, road deaths in Victoria had fallen below 300, less than a third of the 1970 level, the lowest since records were kept, and far below the per capita rate in jurisdictions such as the United States. This reduction was generally attributed to aggressive road safety campaigns beginning with the seat belt laws.

A 2008 study in the Journal of Health Economics found that mandatory seat belt laws in the U.S. "significantly increased seatbelt use among high school age youths by 45-80%" and "significantly reduced traffic fatalities and serious injuries resulting from fatal crashes by 8 and 9%, respectively." The authors note that these "results suggest that if all states had primary enforcement seatbelt laws then regular youth seatbelt use would be nearly universal and youth fatalities would fall by about 120 per year."

== Regulations ==
UNECE has some regulations on seat belt.

Seat belt UNECE regulations (in the scope of the 1958 agreement)
| Entry into force | Regulation number | Name |
|---|---|---|
| 01/04/1970 | 14 | safety-belt anchorages |
| 01/12/1970 | 16 | Safety-belts, restraint systems, child restraint systems and ISOFIX child restraint systems for occupants of power-driven vehicles; Vehicles equipped with safety-belts, safety-belt reminders, restraint systems, child restraint systems and ISOFIX child restraint systems and i-Size child restraint systems |
| 01/02/1981 | 44 | restraining devices for child occupants of power-driven vehicles ("Child Restraint Systems") |
| 09/07/2013 | 129 | Enhanced Child Restraint Systems (ECRS) |
| 09/06/2016 | 137 | passenger cars in the event of a frontal collision with focus on the restraint system |

== Opposition ==
A number of groups and individuals are opposed to seat belt legislation. The most common grounds for opposition are:

- The view that laws requiring the wearing of seat belts are an infringement of individual liberty.
- Claims that official estimates of the number of lives saved by seat belts are overstated or fail to take into account additional risks for other road users.

=== Risk compensation and other theories ===
The most common basis for disputing estimates of the benefits of seat belts is risk compensation and risk homeostasis, advanced by researchers John Adams and Gerald Wilde. The idea of this theory is that, if the risk of death or injury from a car crash is reduced by the wearing of seat belts, drivers will respond by reducing the precautions they take against crashes. Adams accepts the hypothesis that wearing seat belts improves a vehicle occupant's chances of surviving a crash. In order to explain the disparity between the agreed improvement in crash survival and the observed results, Adams and Wilde argue that protecting someone from the consequences of risky behaviour may tend to encourage greater risk taking. Wilde states, "to compel a person to use protection from the consequences of hazardous driving, as seat belt laws do, is to encourage hazardous driving. A fine for non-compliance will encourage seat belt use, but the fact that the law fails to increase people's desire to be safe encourages compensatory behaviour."

Studies and experiments have been carried out to examine the risk compensation theory. In one experiment subjects were asked to drive go-karts around a track under various conditions. It was found that subjects who started driving belted did not drive any slower when subsequently unbelted, but those who started driving unbelted did drive consistently faster when subsequently belted. A study of habitual non-seat belt wearers driving in freeway conditions found evidence that they had adapted to seat belt use by adopting higher driving speeds and closer following distances. In another study, taxi drivers who were habitual non-wearers were timed over a route with passengers who did, and others who did not, insist on the driver wearing a belt. They completed the route faster when belted.

In addition to risk compensation, Adams has suggested other mechanisms that may lead to inaccurate or unsupportable predictions of positive benefits from seat belt legislation.

- Case-control studies based on voluntary use of safety aids can attribute to the aid benefits that actually come from the risk-averse nature of those likely to use them voluntarily (confounding), particularly early adopters.
- Fatality rates are subject to considerable stochastic noise, and comparison of single years or short periods can be misleading.

However, after introduction of seat belt laws in many European and American countries, safety agencies did not validate the compensation theory:

A 2007 study based on data from the Fatality Analysis Reporting System (FARS) of the National Highway Traffic Safety Administration concluded that between 1985 and 2002 there were "significant reductions in fatality rates for occupants and motorcyclists after the implementation of belt use laws", and that "seatbelt use rate is significantly related to lower fatality rates for the total, pedestrian, and all non-occupant models even when controlling for the presence of other state traffic safety policies and a variety of demographic factors". A comprehensive 2003 US study also did "not find any evidence that higher seat belt usage has a significant effect on driving behavior." Their results showed that "overall, mandatory seat belt laws unambiguously reduce traffic fatalities."

=== Individual liberty ===
Opponents have objected to the laws on libertarian principles. Some do so on the grounds that seat belt laws infringe on their civil liberties. For example, in a 1986 letter to the editor of the New York Times, a writer argued that seat belt legislation was "coercive" and that "a mandatory-seat-belt law violates the right to bodily privacy and self-control".

=== Side-effects of seat belts ===
Neck injuries can be caused by the deceleration from a high speed. The passenger’s head continues to move forward while the body is restrained, potentially causing paralyzing injuries. A study of such injuries notes, "Seatbelts save lives. However, they may cause injury to adjacent structures and when they malfunction can cause injury to the abdominal viscera, bony skeleton and vascular structures. The motor industry has attempted to reduce these injuries by modification of vehicle design and safety equipment."

=== Airbag and cost ===
In 1985, some manufacturers believed mandatory cheaper seat belts could stop airbag development, according to The New York Times.

== See also ==
- Car accident
- Click It or Ticket
- Clunk Click Every Trip
- Road safety

== References and further reading ==
- John Adams (1995). Risk. Routledge. ISBN 1-85728-068-7.
- Wilde G.S. Target Risk PDE Publications, 1994
- The Isles report "Seat belt savings: Implications of European Statistics", UK DoT, 1981, Sourced from Death on the Streets, Cars and the Mythology of Road Safety by Robert Davis, Leading Edge Press, North Yorkshire UK, 1992 and "Report questions whether seat belts save lives" by M. Hamer, New Scientist, 7 February 1985 p7
- Evaluation of Automobile Safety Regulations: The case of Compulsory Seat Belt Legislation in Australia. by J.A.C. Coneybeare, Policy Sciences 12:27-39, 1980
- Compulsory Seat Belt Use: Further Inferences, by P. Hurst Accident Analysis and Prevention., Vol 11: 27–33, 1979
- Wilde G. S. Risk Homeostasis and Traffic Accidents Propositions, Deductions and Discussion of Dissension in Recent Reactions, Ergonomics 1988 Vol, 31, 4:439
- Methodological Issues in Testing the Hypothesis of Risk Compensation by Brian Dulisse, Accident Analysis and Prevention Vol. 25 (5): 285–292, 1997
- RS 255 The initial impact of seat belt legislation in Ireland by R. Hearne, An Foras Forbatha, Dublin, 1981
- The efficacy of seat belt legislation: A comparative study of road accident fatality statistics from 18 countries, by J. Adams. Department of Geography University College, London 1981
- Casualty Reductions, Whose Problem? By F. West-Oram, Traffic Engineering and Control, September 1990
- The Puzzle of Seat Belts Explained, Press Release of the Annual Conference of the British Psychological Society, April 1999
- Reconsidering the effects of seat belt Laws and Their Enforcement Status by T.S. Dee Accident Analysis and Prevention., Vol 30(1): 1–10, 1998
