= FCA =

FCA may refer to:

== Arts ==
- Federation of Canadian Artists
- Footscray Community Arts, an arts centre in Footscray, Melbourne, Australia
- Foundation for Contemporary Art, in Ghana
- Foundation for Contemporary Arts, in the United States

== Business and economics ==
- FCA India Automobiles, Indian automobile manufacturer, subsidiary of Stellantis
- False Claims Act, a United States federal law
- Farm Credit Administration, active during the New Deal era
- Federal Customs Authority, of the United Arab Emirates
- Fellow of Chartered Accountants, awarded by various bodies:
  - Canadian Institute of Chartered Accountants
  - Institute of Chartered Accountants in England and Wales
  - Institute of Chartered Accountants of Sri Lanka
- Fiji Consumers Association
- Financial Collection Agencies, a defunct accounts receivable management company
- Financial Conduct Authority, financial regulator in the United Kingdom
- Foreign currency account
- Free Carrier, an international commerce term similar to FOB
- Full-cost accounting
- Function cost analysis
- A component of FVA - one of the X-Value Adjustments in relation to derivative instruments held by banks

== Religion ==
- Fellowship of Christian Assemblies
- Fellowship of Christian Athletes
- Fellowship of Confessing Anglicans
- Foundation Christian Academy, in Valrico, Florida, United States

== Sports ==
- Cuban Athletics Federation (Spanish Federación Cubana de Atletismo)
- FC Aarau, a football club in Switzerland
- FC Astana, a football club in Kazakhstan
- FC Augsburg, a football club in Germany
- Fellowship of Christian Athletes

== Transportation ==
- Fiat Chrysler Automobiles, a defunct Italian-American multinational automobile manufacturer now part of Stellantis
- Ferrocarril Central Argentino, an Argentine railway company
- Ferrovia Centro Atlântica, a Brazilian railway company
- First Choice Airways, a defunct British airline
- Florida Coastal Airlines, a defunct American airline
- IATA code for Glacier Park International Airport, in Montana, United States

== Other uses ==
- Facility condition assessment
- Family Caregiver Alliance
- Family Christian Academy (disambiguation), various entities
- Federal Court of Appeal (Canada)
- Federal Court of Australia
- Federated Confectioners' Association of Australia, a defunct trade union
- Feline cutaneous asthenia
- Ferengi Commerce Authority
- Finnish Cannabis Association
- Fixed channel allocation, in wireless networks
- Flood Control Act, a series of US federal laws
- Flux-cored arc welding
- Formal concept analysis
- Fórsa Cosanta Áitiúil, the former reserve force of the Irish Army
- Framework Convention Alliance, a tobacco-control organization
- Frontier Closed Area, between Hong Kong and the rest of China
- French Camp Academy, in Mississippi, United States
- Freund's complete adjuvant
- University of Campinas School of Applied Sciences (Portuguese: Faculdade de Ciências Aplicadas)
