= Winged cat =

Mythological animal

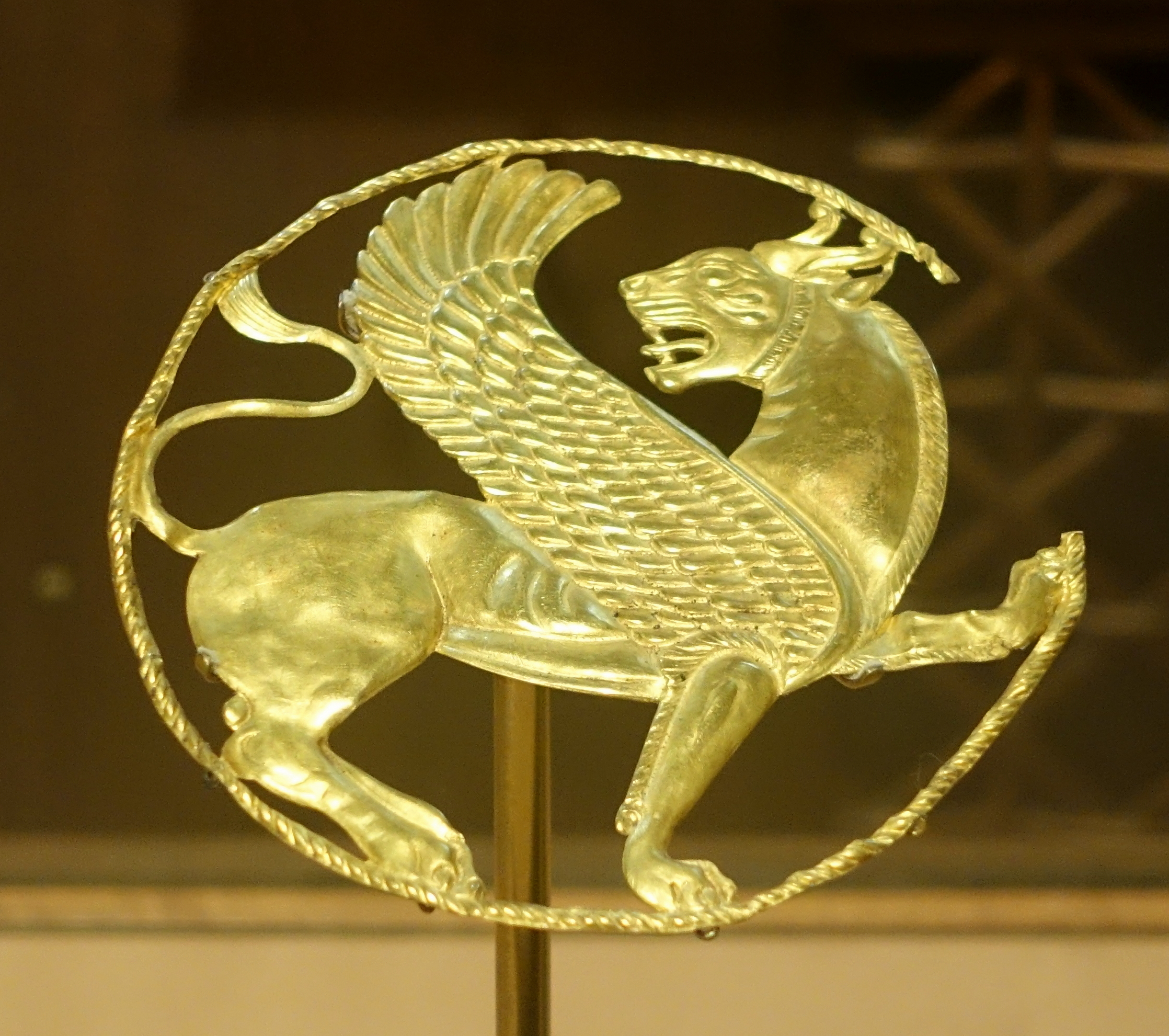
Winged lion sculpture from the Persian city of Ecbatana, 550-330 BCE

The winged cat – a feline with wings like a bird, bat or other flying creature – is a theme in artwork and legend going back to prehistory, especially mythological depictions of big cats with eagle wings in Eurasia and North Africa. Belief in domestic cats with wings persists to the present day as an urban legend.

Sightings of cats with supposed wings are easily explained by medical conditions that can result in matted hair, loose skin, or supernumerary limbs on or near the shoulders, that flap about in a wing-like manner as the cat runs.

== Big cats in mythology ==
Pantherines with wings, especially winged lions, are a common theme in ancient religious and mythological art of the Sumerians and other Mesopotamians, Akkadians, Persians, and Scythians, and other peoples with whom they came into contact and shared ideas in the Middle East, Near East, and Europe. These sometimes also feature a winged cat's body with a bird's head (e.g., the gryphon) or human face (e.g. the lamassu and sphinx). It is hardly a unique, biologically impossible, artistic conceit in works of Classical Antiquity; Greco-Roman, Egyptian, and other works also often depicted winged horses (Pterippus) such as Pegasus, animal-headed human figures (the Minotaur, and many Egyptian deities like the cat-headed Bastet and Sekhmet), half-human and half-horse figures (the centaur), and other mythological part-cat beasts, such as the Chimera. Art of this sort featuring felids dates back to the Upper Paleolithic era, to 40,000 BCE, though it is uncertain when winged felines in particular were first represented.

Aq Bars is a legendary winged snow leopard, a symbol of ancient Turkic and Bulgar origin, and going back to an uncertain period in pre-literate history. Emblematic use of snow leopards with wings continues in the modern coat of arms of Tatarstan, Russian Federation; Samarqand, Uzbekistan; and Nur-Sultan, Kazakhstan.

The Lion of Saint Mark

Such fanciful creatures appear twice in the context of the Judeo-Christian bible. In the Book of Daniel of the Hebrew Bible and Christian Old Testament, the first beast in the vision of the beasts from the sea (chapter 7, dating to around the 2nd century BC) resembled a winged lion. The (probably unrelated) Lion of Saint Mark is the winged heraldic symbol of Mark the Evangelist of the New Testament (1st century AD), and features prominently in Christian art from the early church to the present day. In later, medieval Christianity, both cats (of the domestic sort) and bats were associated with the Devil, and demons were sometimes depicted as bat-winged cats. For example, an Athanasius Kircher engraving from 1667 depicted a demonic creature with a cat's head, bat's wings and human torso.

== Winged domestic cats ==
=== Medical explanations ===
There are three different causes of wing-like appendages. The most common is long-haired cats having matted fur that can form if it is not properly groomed. Less commonly, mats can occur in shorthaired cats if molted fur adheres to growing fur. When the cat runs, the mats flap up and down and give the impression of wings. These can be very uncomfortable for the cat and can harbour dirt, feces and parasites. Extensive mats must be shaved or clipped by a veterinarian. This explanation is ultimately untenable as the sole solution to the winged cat phenomenon, for several reasons. Many notable examples of winged cats feature shorthaired specimens. The occurrence of mats in longhaired cats is easily recognisable by experienced cat owners and breeders, but not recognisable to novices. Matted fur is not considered notable and rarely reported, except by those unfamiliar with the condition. Although mats can occur all over a longhaired cat's body, to novice eyes, they are most noticeable on the flanks when the cat is in motion.

The second explanation of reports of winged cats is a skin condition called feline cutaneous asthenia, which is related to Ehlers–Danlos syndrome (elastic skin) in humans. In "winged" cats with cutaneous asthenia, the pseudo-wings only occur on the shoulders, haunches, or back, and the cats can often actively move these growths, suggesting the presence of neuromuscular tissue within them, which is not present within clumps of matted fur alone.

The third explanation is a form of conjoining or extra supernumerary limbs. These non-functional or poorly functional growths would be fur-covered and might resemble wings, as in one winged-cat case recently documented by Karl Shuker, in which the "wings" were shown to be supernumerary limbs.

There are more than 138 reported sightings of animals claimed to be winged cats, though most of these are clearly nothing more than individuals with clumps of matted fur, some cases of cutaneous asthenia or supernumerary limbs, and others taxidermy frauds (freakshow "grifts"), or just sensationalist tabloid journalism. There are over 30 documented cases (with physical evidence) and at least 20 photographs, and one video. There is at least one stuffed winged cat, but this may be a nineteenth-century grift.

There is no evidence of actual bird- or bat-like wings, and there is no scientific reason to believe such a thing is possible. The only true winged mammals, bats, have wings in place of arms, as do birds, while species of gliding mammals like flying squirrels, have membranes of skin that stretch between the front and rear limbs. Neither feature has ever been reported for cats. Classical and modern art featuring cats, as well as reports of alleged winged cats, uniformly place the wings or apparent wings on the back of cats with four legs.

=== Reports of sightings ===
- The earliest currently known report of a winged cat is from Henry David Thoreau: "A few years before I lived in the woods there was what was called a 'winged cat' in one of the farm-houses in Lincoln nearest the pond, Mr. Gillian Baker's. When I called to see her in June, 1842, she was gone a-hunting in the woods, as was her wont ... but her mistress told me that she came into the neighborhood a little more than a year before, in April, and was finally taken into their house; that she was of a dark brownish-grey colour, with a white spot on her throat, and white feet, and had a large bushy tail like a fox; that in the winter the fur grew thick and flattened out along her sides, forming strips ten or twelve inches long by two and a half wide, and under her chin like a muff, the upper side loose, the under matted like felt, and in the spring these appendages dropped off. They gave me a pair of her 'wings,' which I keep still. There is no appearance of a membrane about them. Some thought it was part flying squirrel or some other wild animal, which is not impossible, for, according to naturalists, prolific hybrids have been produced by the union of the marten and the domestic cat."
- In the 19th century, there was an alleged winged cat at the centre of a custody dispute with one party claiming him to be their cat, Thomas, and the other claiming it to be their feline, Bessy.
- In Animal Fakes and Frauds (1976), S. Peter Dance described a 19th-century winged cat that was preserved and offered for sale in the early 1960s. Its wings had grown when the cat was very young. It had been exhibited during the 19th century by a circus owner, but, when its original owner demanded its return, the cat mysteriously died. It was stuffed but has not been properly examined.
- A "flying cat" was reported in India in 1868. It was shot by Alexander Gibson, and the skin was exhibited at a meeting of the Bombay Asiatic Society. Gibson believed it to be a cat, but others claim it to be a bat or flying fox.
- In August 1894, a cat said to have wings resembling those of a duckling was being exhibited by David Badcock of Reach, Cambridgeshire, England. It was later stolen and turned up in Liverpool, England, but had shed its wings.
- In 1897, a tortoiseshell cat with pheasant-like wings projecting from each side of its 4th ribs was reported shot and killed in Matlock, Derbyshire. The story appeared in the High Peak News of Saturday, 26 June 1897. Witnesses claimed the cat used its wings outstretched to help run faster.
- In 1899, London's Strand Magazine reported a winged cat or kitten belonging to a woman living in Wiveliscombe, Somerset, England. Cat show judge HC Brooke also described it in the weekly magazine Cat Gossip in 1927: "This cat had growing from its back two appendages which reminded the observer irresistibly of the wings of a chicken before the adult feathers appear. These appendages were not flabby, but apparently gristly, about six or eight inches long, and place in exactly the position assumed by the wings of a bird in the act of taking flight. They did not make their appearance until the kitten was several weeks old." Someone attempted to cut off the wings, with fatal consequences for the cat.
- In 1933 or 1934, a winged black-and-white cat was claimed to have been captured in Oxford, England by Mrs Hughes Griffiths. She claimed it used its six-inch wings to aid in jumping long distances. It was exhibited for a while at Oxford Zoo.
- In 1936, a winged cat was supposedly found on a farm near Portpatrick, Wigtownshire, Scotland. It was a white long-haired cat, and the wings were flaps 6 in (15 cm) long and 3 in (7.5 cm) wide on its back. They flapped up and down when the cat ran. This is consistent with badly matted fur.
- In 1939, Sally, a black-and-white cat said to have a 24-inch wingspan, from Attercliffe, Sheffield, England, was sold to a Blackpool museum of freaks.
- During World War II, an overweight black-and-white cat in Ashford, Middlesex, became a local attraction because of the wings which sprouted from its shoulders. This also seems like a case of matted fur.
- In June 1949, a 20-pound cat with a 23-inch wingspan was said to have been shot in northern Sweden. A Professor Rendahl of the State Museum of Natural History said the wings were a deformity of the skin which happened to take the shape of wings.
- In 1950, a tortoiseshell cat called Sandy with "sizable" wings was exhibited at a carnival in Sutton, Nottinghamshire. Sandy had not previously grown wings, so this seems a case of matted fur.
- In either 1950 or 1959, Madrid papers reported that Juan Priego's grey Angora cat, Angolina, had grown a pair of large fluffy wings.
- In May 1959, a "winged" Persian cat was caught near Pineville, West Virginia. The finder, Douglas Shelton, named it Thomas, but, after the cat made headlines, Mrs Charles Hicks claimed it was her lost cat, Mitzi. When the cat was produced in court, her wings had fallen off and turned out to be extensive mats of fur.
- In 1966, a winged cat from Alfred, Ontario, Canada, was killed and was examined by scientists at Kemptville Agricultural School. The wings were nothing more than matted fur. The cat was also suffering from rabies.
- In the October/November 1967 issue of the Cats Protection League's periodical The Cat, Cecily Waddon reported a matted Persian whose felted fur resembled wings and flapped when the cat moved.
- In 1970, J. A. Sandford of Wallingford, Connecticut saw a "winged" cat in a neighbor's garden. The orange-and-white longhaired cat was "positively waddling due to large wing-like growths hanging from its midsection." The owner claimed it was how the cat shed its fur in summer. The fur was matted into rectangular pads about five inches long by four inches wide. Some claim it to be a case of feline cutaneous asthenia, but it is a textbook case of matted fur.
- In 1975, the Manchester Evening News published a photograph of a winged cat which had lived in the Banister Walton & Co builder's yard at Trafford Park, Manchester, England, during the 1960s. It had a pair of 11-inch-long fluffy wings projecting from its back. The skin of its tail was flattened into a broad flap. Workmen reported that the cat could raise its wings above its body, suggesting the deformity contained muscle as well as skin. This sometimes happens with cutaneous asthenia.
- In 1986, a winged cat was reported in Anglesey, Britain, and later shed its wings, suggesting they were mats of fur.
- In April 1995, Martin Millner claimed to have spotted a fluffy winged tabby in Backbarrow, Cumbria, England.
- In 1998, a black cat was found in Northwood, Middlesex, with supposed wings that were 2-3 inches back from the shoulder blades, 8 inches long, 4 inches wide, 1 inch thick, and flapped as the cat ran.
- In 2004, at Bukreyevk (near Kursk), Central Russia, a winged, ginger, stray tomcat named Vaska was drowned by superstitious villagers, according to the local Komsomolskaya Pravda newspaper.
- In 2007, in Xianyang, Shaanxi province, China, it was claimed that a one-year-old tomcat grew ten-centimeter-long wings, with bones, in just one month, starting out as bumps. The owner, Feng, believed it was because the cat had been sexually harassed by other cats. The story appeared in the newspaper Huashang.
- In May 2009, another winged cat was reported in China, with the story appearing on MSNBC.
- In 2011, a "winged" cat was reported in Tatarstan, Russia, becoming famous due to a YouTube video. It was informally called Aq Bars, after the winged snow leopard on Tatarstan's coat of arms.

== In modern popular culture ==
As detailed above, a winged cat appears in the chapter "Brute Neighbors" in Walden by Henry David Thoreau. Domestic cats, and sometimes larger types (panthers, etc.), with wings are today a frequent trope in fantasy art and fiction:

- Whiskers, a recurring character in Michael Moorcock's Multiverse is a winged cat usually in the company of Jhary-a-Conel in novels published from 1967 to 1974.
- The Fantastic Art of Boris Vallejo (1980), one of the most popular and influential single-artist fantasy and science fiction art books, prominently features a painting of a winged lion and a warrior woman.
- Catwings, a 1988–1999 series of children's picture books by Ursula K. Le Guin, features several winged cats.
- In the 1980s and 1990s, the Forgotten Realms role-playing game and related fantasy novels depicted shy winged cat-owl hybrids, called tressym, as the familiars of wizards.
- The character Myau of the first Phantasy Star video game (1987) eats a special nut that gives him wings.
- In Marvel comics associated with the character Thor, a subspecies of the Light Elves have winged cats that serve as their steeds. These Cat Elves first appeared in Alpha Flight #81 (Feb. 1990) and were created by James Hudnall and John Calimee.
- Winged Panther is #40 in the Monster in My Pocket series (1989).
- The Final Fantasy V video game (1992) generates many random enemy encounters with winged felines.
- In the Lunar video game series (1992 onward), two supporting characters, Nall and Ruby, resemble flying cats for most of the game and even have stereotypical feline tendencies, like fish being a favorite dish.
- The Cardcaptor Sakura (1996–2000) and Cardcaptor Sakura: Clear Card (2016–2024) manga series feature Spinel Sun, a character who presents himself as both a winged black cat and a winged black panther.
- The Beyblade manga series (1999–2004) includes a winged cat, the Bit-Beast Venus.
- A children's book by Laura Von Stetina, Mewingham Manor: Observations on a Curious New Species (Greenwich Workshop Press, 2002), features butterfly-winged kittens or "flittens". A line of flitten figurines is also produced by the publisher.
- Happy, a character in the Japanese manga series Fairy Tail (2006 onward), is a blue cat who has wings (only when he wants.)
- In the Ni no Kuni: Wrath of the White Witch video game (2011), the Auroralynx familiar is a winged cat.
- The Skylanders video game series (2011–2016) includes a feathercat, Scratch, as a playable character introduced in Swap Force.
- The Bradford Editions produces a series, "Almost Purr-fect Angels", of winged cat fantasy figurines.
- The Jaquins from Elena of Avalor are a cross between a jaguar and a macaw. Aside from their wings, they have feathers on the back of their legs and on the end of their tails.
- The Spellshop, a cozy fantasy book by Sarah Beth Durst (published July 2024), features winged cats. The winged cats live on the island of Caltrey. They freely lounge on roof tops adding a whimsical element to the story.

== See also ==
- Phantom cat
