= Cutaneous asthenia =

Skin disorder

Cutaneous asthenia is a skin disorder caused by a collagen defect. Collagen is the protein that binds the cells of the dermis together. It is also called dermatoproxy, hereditary skin fragility or cutis elastica ("elastic skin") and is found in humans, cats, dogs, mink, horses, cattle and sheep. In cattle and sheep, it is called dermatosparaxis ('torn skin'). The skin is also abnormally fragile. The skin flaps peel or slough off very easily, often without causing bleeding. This explains why cats with the condition suddenly "molt" their wings.

It is variously known as:

- Ehlers–Danlos syndrome — humans
- Hereditary equine regional dermal asthenia — horses
- Feline cutaneous asthenia — cats
