= Independence, Missouri =

- City
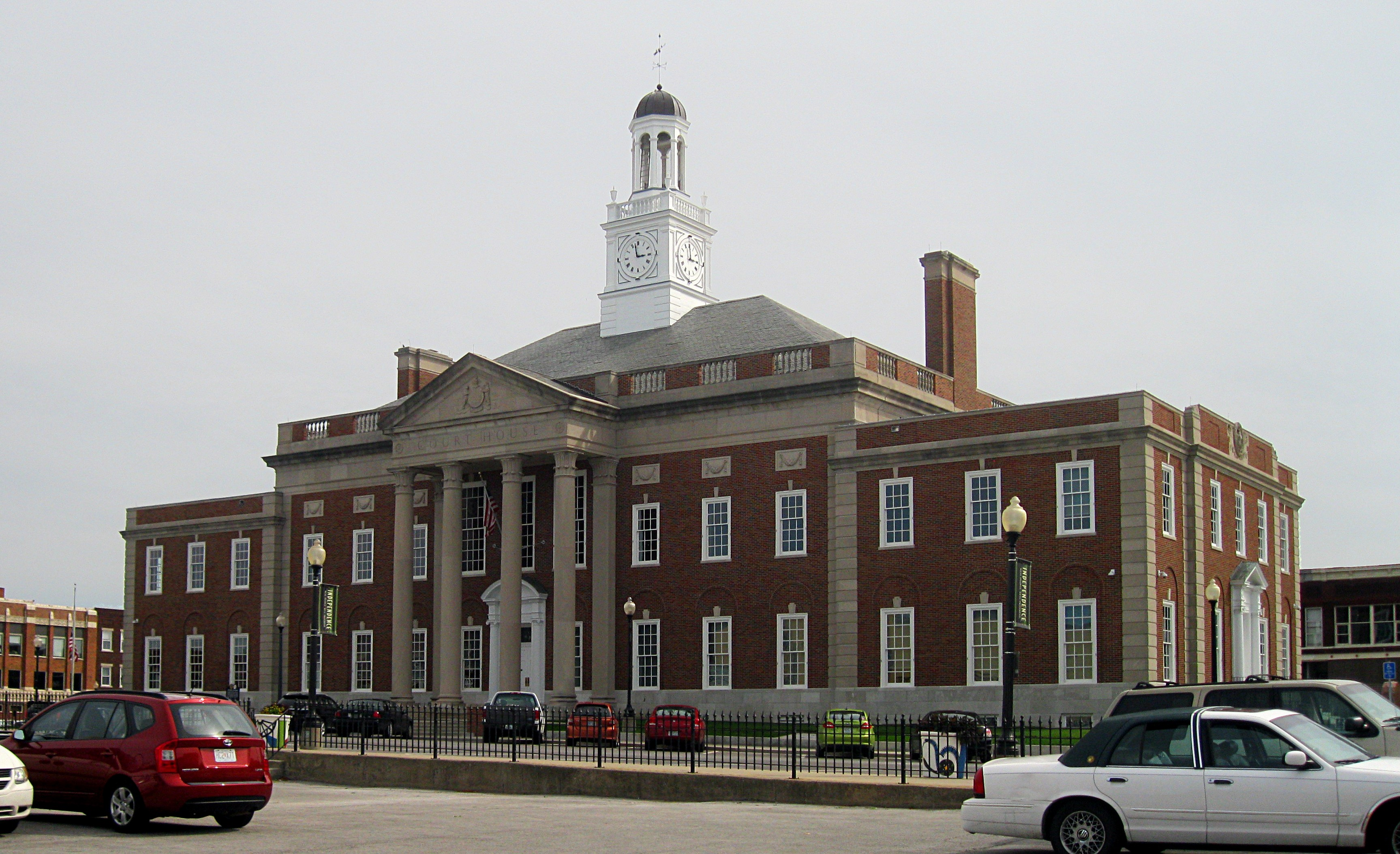
- Jackson County Courthouse in Independence

- Seal Logo
- Interactive map of Independence, Missouri
- Location within Missouri Location within the United States
- Coordinates: 39°5′33″N 94°24′50″W
- Country: United States
- State: Missouri
- Counties: Jackson, Clay
- Founded: March 29, 1827
- Named for: The Declaration of Independence

Government
  - Mayor: Kevin King
  - City Manager: Troy Anderson

Area
  - Total: 78.42 sq mi (203.10 km^{2})
  - Land: 77.97 sq mi (201.93 km^{2})
  - Water: 0.45 sq mi (1.17 km^{2})
- Elevation: 863 ft (263 m)

Population (2020)
  - Total: 123,011
  - Density: 1,577.7/sq mi (609.17/km^{2})
- Demonym: Independencian
- Time zone: UTC−6 (Central (CST))
  - Summer (DST): UTC−5 (CDT)
- ZIP Codes: 64050–64058
- Area codes: 816, 975
- FIPS code: 29-35000
- Website: www.independencemo.gov

Independence is a city mostly in, and one of two county seats of, Jackson County, Missouri, United States. It is a satellite city of Kansas City, Missouri, and is the largest suburb on the Missouri side of the Kansas City metropolitan area. In 2020, it had a total population of 123,011, making it the fifth-most populous city in Missouri. A small part of the city extends into Clay County.

Independence is known as the "Queen City of the Trails" because it was a point of departure for the California, Oregon, and Santa Fe Trails. It is the hometown of U.S. President Harry S. Truman, and houses the Harry S. Truman Presidential Library and Museum and the gravesites of Truman and First Lady Bess Truman. It is sacred to the Latter Day Saint movement, as the site of Joseph Smith's 1831 Temple Lot, and several Mormon denominations are headquartered in the city.

== History ==
The area that is now Independence was originally inhabited by Missouri and Osage Native Americans. Later made part of the territory of Louisiana that was alternately part of New France and New Spain, it became part of the United States with the Louisiana Purchase in 1803. The Lewis and Clark Expedition stopped in what would become Independence in 1804.

Named after the Declaration of Independence, Independence was founded on March 29, 1827, and quickly became an important frontier town. Independence was the farthest point westward on the Missouri River where steamboats or other cargo vessels could travel, due to the convergence of the Kansas River with the Missouri River approximately six miles west of town. Independence immediately became a jumping-off point for the emerging fur trade, accommodating merchants and adventurers beginning the long trek westward on the Santa Fe Trail.

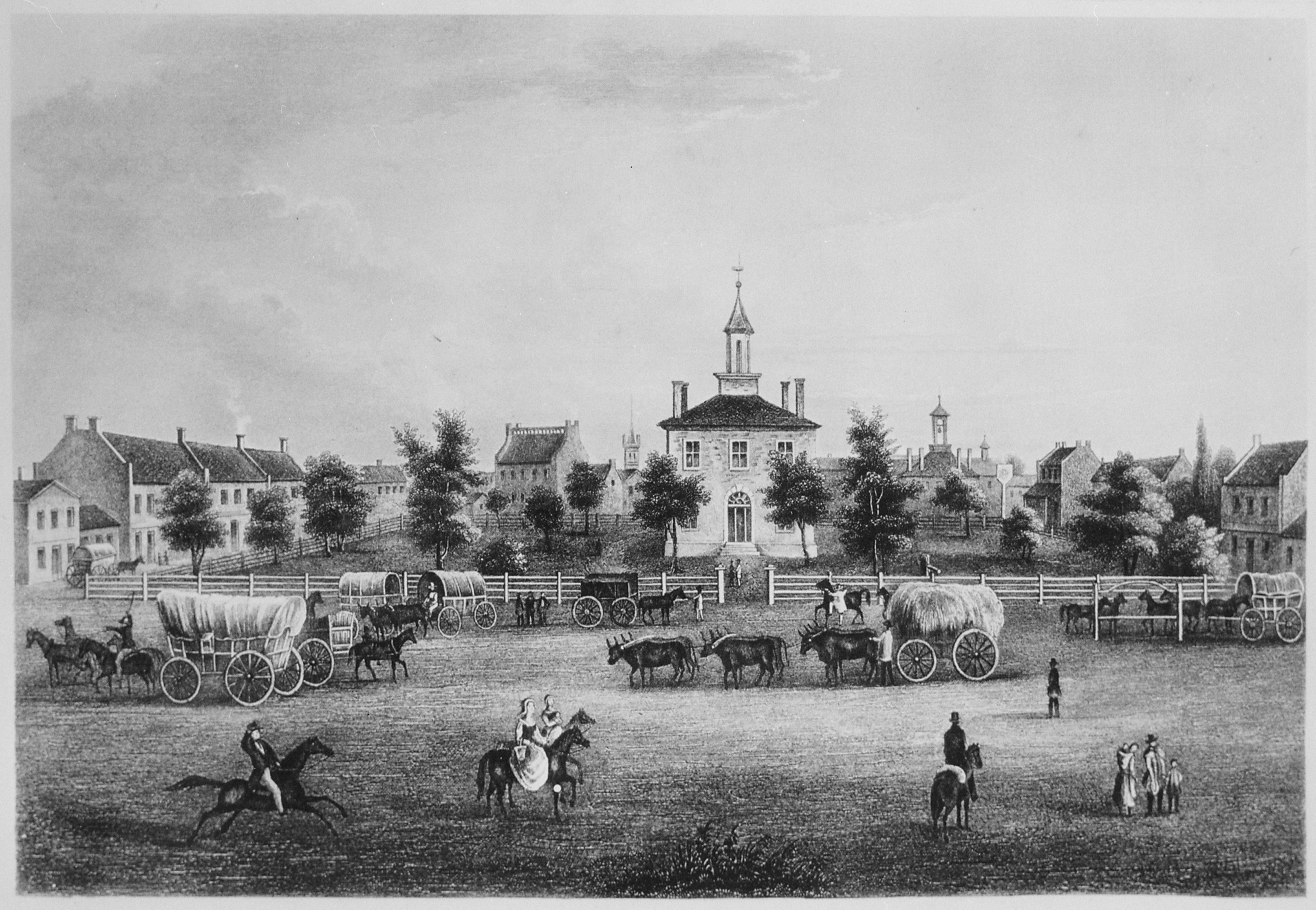
Engraving of the Courthouse in Independence, 1855

In 1831, members of the Latter Day Saint movement began moving to the area. Shortly thereafter, founder Joseph Smith declared a spot west of the Courthouse Square to be the place for his prophesied temple of the New Jerusalem, in expectation of the Second Coming of Christ. Tension grew with local Missourians until the Latter Day Saints were driven from the area in 1833, the beginning of a conflict which culminated in the 1838 Mormon War. Several branches of this movement gradually returned to the city beginning in 1867, with many making their headquarters there. These include the Community of Christ (formerly the Reorganized Church of Jesus Christ of Latter Day Saints), the Church of Christ (Temple Lot), the Church of Jesus Christ (Cutlerite), and the Restoration Branches.

Independence saw great prosperity from the late 1830s through the mid-1840s, while the business of outfitting pioneers boomed. Between 1848 and 1868, it was a hub of the California Trail. The Donner Party, an ill-fated group of wagon train emigrants whose westward journey along the trail from Springfield, Illinois, ended in disaster, stopped in Independence. On March 8, 1849, the Missouri General Assembly granted a home-rule charter to the town, and on July 18, 1849, William McCoy was elected as its first mayor. In the mid-19th century, an Act of the United States Congress defined Independence as the start of the Oregon Trail.

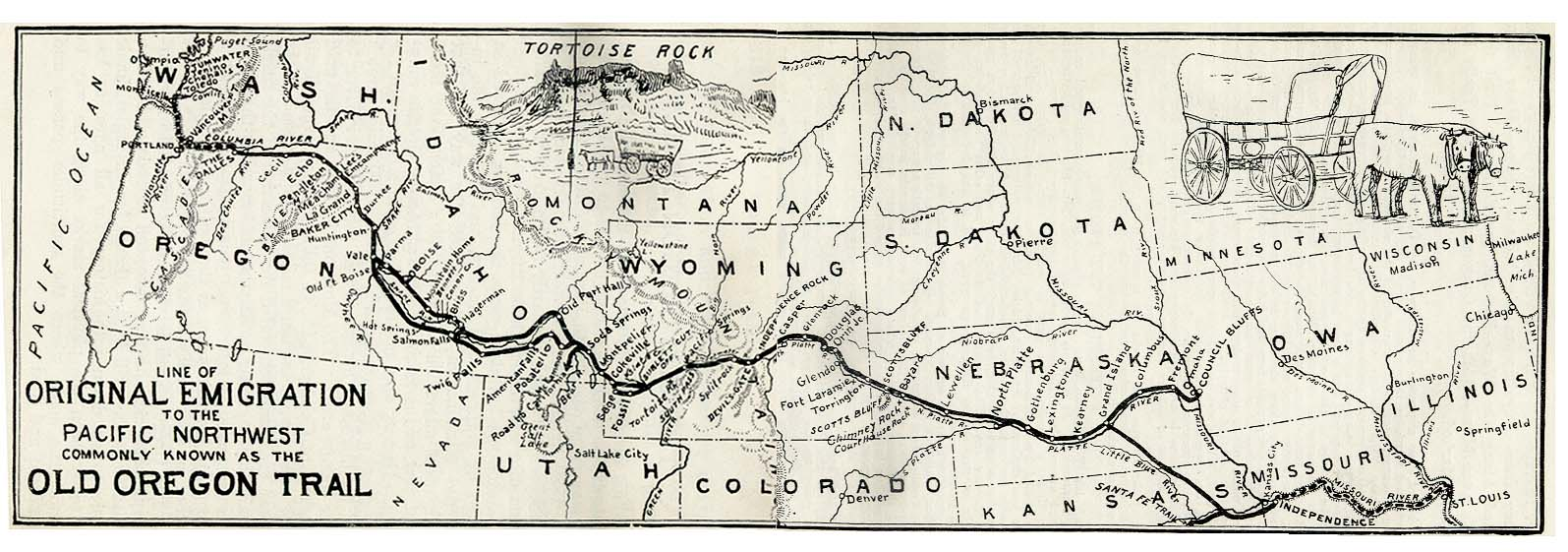
A map of the Oregon Trail, marking Independence

Two important American Civil War battles occurred at Independence: the first on August 11, 1862, when Confederate soldiers took control of the town, and the second in October 1864, which resulted in a Union victory. The war took its toll on Independence, and the town was never able to regain its previous prosperity, although a flurry of building activity took place soon after the war. The rise of nearby Kansas City, Missouri also contributed to the town's relegation to a place of secondary prominence in Jackson County, though Independence has retained its position as co-county seat to the present day.

United States President Harry S. Truman grew up in Independence and, in 1922, was elected judge of the Court of Jackson County with the support of Kansas City political boss Tom Pendergast. Although he was defeated for reelection in 1924, he won back the office in 1926 and was reelected in 1930. Truman won acclaim for several popular public works projects, including an extensive series of roads for the growing use of automobiles, the building of a new County Court building in Independence, and a series of 12 Madonna of the Trail monuments to pioneer women dedicated across the country in 1928 and 1929. He returned to the city following his presidency. His wife, Bess, was born and raised in Independence, and both are buried there. The Harry S. Truman National Historic Site (Truman's home) and the Harry S. Truman Presidential Library and Museum are both located in Independence, as is one of Truman's boyhood residences.

== Geography ==
Independence is located on the south bank of the Missouri River, near the western edge of the state. According to the United States Census Bureau, the city has a total area of 78.25 square miles (202.67 km^{2}), of which 77.57 square miles (200.91 km^{2}) is land and 0.68 square miles (1.76 km^{2}) is water.

Climate data for Independence, Missouri (1991–2020 normals, extremes 1973–2021)
Month	Jan	Feb	Mar	Apr	May	Jun	Jul	Aug	Sep	Oct	Nov	Dec	Year
Record high °F (°C)	74 (23)	79 (26)	87 (31)	94 (34)	93 (34)	103 (39)	104 (40)	109 (43)	103 (39)	94 (34)	82 (28)	72 (22)	109 (43)
Mean maximum °F (°C)	62.2 (16.8)	67.9 (19.9)	77.6 (25.3)	83.0 (28.3)	87.8 (31.0)	93.4 (34.1)	96.9 (36.1)	97.4 (36.3)	92.3 (33.5)	84.9 (29.4)	72.6 (22.6)	64.8 (18.2)	99.3 (37.4)
Mean daily maximum °F (°C)	37.6 (3.1)	43.0 (6.1)	54.5 (12.5)	64.6 (18.1)	73.9 (23.3)	82.9 (28.3)	86.9 (30.5)	86.0 (30.0)	78.4 (25.8)	66.5 (19.2)	53.0 (11.7)	41.8 (5.4)	64.1 (17.8)
Daily mean °F (°C)	28.4 (−2.0)	33.1 (0.6)	43.5 (6.4)	53.6 (12.0)	63.8 (17.7)	73.2 (22.9)	77.4 (25.2)	75.8 (24.3)	67.7 (19.8)	55.8 (13.2)	43.3 (6.3)	32.9 (0.5)	54.0 (12.2)
Mean daily minimum °F (°C)	19.2 (−7.1)	23.1 (−4.9)	32.6 (0.3)	42.6 (5.9)	53.7 (12.1)	63.5 (17.5)	67.8 (19.9)	65.7 (18.7)	57.0 (13.9)	45.1 (7.3)	33.5 (0.8)	23.9 (−4.5)	44.0 (6.7)
Mean minimum °F (°C)	−0.1 (−17.8)	6.3 (−14.3)	15.1 (−9.4)	28.1 (−2.2)	40.7 (4.8)	51.7 (10.9)	58.7 (14.8)	56.7 (13.7)	43.3 (6.3)	29.7 (−1.3)	17.7 (−7.9)	6.2 (−14.3)	−3.3 (−19.6)
Record low °F (°C)	−16 (−27)	−13 (−25)	−5 (−21)	14 (−10)	30 (−1)	43 (6)	50 (10)	43 (6)	33 (1)	20 (−7)	1 (−17)	−14 (−26)	−16 (−27)
Average precipitation inches (mm)	1.50 (38)	1.86 (47)	2.88 (73)	4.43 (113)	5.99 (152)	5.28 (134)	5.11 (130)	5.06 (129)	4.77 (121)	3.54 (90)	2.40 (61)	1.84 (47)	44.66 (1,134)
Average snowfall inches (cm)	3.6 (9.1)	2.6 (6.6)	1.7 (4.3)	0.2 (0.51)	0.0 (0.0)	0.0 (0.0)	0.0 (0.0)	0.0 (0.0)	0.0 (0.0)	0.4 (1.0)	1.2 (3.0)	3.5 (8.9)	13.2 (34)
Average precipitation days (≥ 0.01 in)	6.8	6.2	9.6	10.9	13.3	9.9	10.0	9.2	8.6	8.7	6.8	6.9	106.9
Average snowy days (≥ 0.1 in)	3.0	2.1	1.1	0.2	0.0	0.0	0.0	0.0	0.0	0.0	0.2	2.8	10.0
Source: NOAA

== Demographics ==
Historical population
Census	Pop.	Note	%±
1860	3,164		—
1870	3,184		0.6%
1880	3,146		−1.2%
1890	6,380		102.8%
1900	6,974		9.3%
1910	9,859		41.4%
1920	11,686		18.5%
1930	15,296		30.9%
1940	16,066		5.0%
1950	36,963		130.1%
1960	62,328		68.6%
1970	111,630		79.1%
1980	111,806		0.2%
1990	112,295		0.4%
2000	113,288		0.9%
2010	116,830		3.1%
2020	123,011		5.3%
U.S. Decennial Census; 2018 Estimate

=== Racial and ethnic composition ===
Independence, Missouri – Racial and ethnic composition Note: the U.S. census treats Hispanic/Latino as an ethnic category. This table excludes Latinos from the racial categories and assigns them to a separate category. Hispanics/Latinos may be of any race.
Race / Ethnicity (NH = Non-Hispanic)	Pop 2000	Pop 2010	Pop 2020	% 2000	% 2010	% 2020
White alone (NH)	102,040	96,086	85,754	90.07%	82.24%	69.71%
Black or African American alone (NH)	2,874	6,265	10,345	2.54%	5.36%	8.41%
Native American or Alaska Native alone (NH)	647	601	609	0.57%	0.51%	0.50%
Asian alone (NH)	783	1,114	1,444	0.69%	0.95%	1.17%
Native Hawaiian or Pacific Islander alone (NH)	508	771	796	0.45%	0.66%	0.65%
Other race alone (NH)	119	87	507	0.11%	0.07%	0.41%
Mixed race or Multiracial (NH)	2,142	2,907	8,514	1.89%	2.49%	6.92%
Hispanic or Latino (any race)	4,175	8,999	15,042	3.69%	7.70%	12.23%
Total	113,288	116,830	123,011	100.00%	100.00%	100.00%

=== 2020 census ===
The 2020 United States census counted 123,011 people, 48,836 households, and 28,955 families in Independence. The population density was 1,577.7 per square mile (609.2/km^{2}). There were 54,120 housing units at an average density of 694.1 units per square mile (268.0 units/km^{2}). The racial makeup (including Hispanics in the racial counts) was 72.61% (89,323) white, 8.68% (10,678) black or African-American, 0.76% (936) Native American, 1.19% (1,468) Asian, 0.67% (826) Pacific Islander, 5.52% (6,795) from other races, and 10.56% (12,985) from two or more races. Hispanic or Latino of any race was 12.2% (15,042) of the population.

Of the 48,836 households, 24.0% had children under the age of 18; 40.1% were married couples living together; 33.0% had a female householder with no husband present. Of all households, 33.5% consisted of individuals and 14.2% had someone living alone who was 65 years of age or older. The average household size was 2.4, and the average family size was 3.1.

21.5% of the population was under the age of 18, 7.6% from 18 to 24, 24.8% from 25 to 44, 24.0% from 45 to 64, and 17.3% who were 65 years of age or older. The median age was 39.5 years. For every 100 females, the population had 91.4 males. For every 100 females ages 18 and older, there were 89.4 males.

The 2016–2020 5-year American Community Survey estimates show that the median household income was $50,797 (with a margin of error of +/- $1,935) and the median family income was $64,271 (+/- $2,089). Males had a median income of $40,007 (+/- $1,690) versus $26,762 (+/- $1,098) for females. The median income for those above 16 years old was $32,462 (+/- $1,353). Approximately, 11.2% of families and 14.0% of the population were below the poverty line, including 23.3% of those under the age of 18 and 7.1% of those ages 65 or over.

=== 2010 census ===
As of the census of 2010, there were 116,830 people, 48,742 households, and 30,165 families residing in the city. The population density was 1,506.1 inhabitants per square mile (581.5/km^{2}). There were 53,834 housing units at an average density of 694.0 units per square mile (268.0 units/km^{2}). The racial makeup of the city was

- 85.7% White,
- 5.6% African American,
- 0.6% Native American,
- 1.0% Asian,
- 0.7% Pacific Islander alone (1.0% Pacific Islander alone or in combination with one or more other races),
- 3.2% from other races, and 3.2% from two or more races.
- Hispanic or Latino of any race were 7.7% of the population.
- Non-Hispanic Whites were 82.2% of the population, down from 98.4% in 1970.

There were 48,742 households, of which 29.3% had children under the age of 18 living with them, 42.5% were married couples living together, 13.9% had a female householder with no husband present, 5.4% had a male householder with no wife present, and 38.1% were non-families. 31.7% of all households were made up of individuals, and 11.5% had someone living alone who was 65 years of age or older. The average household size was 2.37, and the average family size was 2.97.

The median age in the city was 39.4 years. 23% of residents were under the age of 18; 8.6% were between the ages of 18 and 24; 24.9% were from 25 to 44; 27.4% were from 45 to 64; and 16.1% were 65 years of age or older. The gender makeup of the city was 48.0% male and 52.0% female.

=== 2000 census ===
As of the census of 2000, there were 113,288 people, 47,390 households, and 30,566 families residing in the city. The population density was 1,446.3 inhabitants per square mile (558.4/km^{2}). There were 50,213 housing units at an average density of 641.1 units per square mile (247.5 units/km^{2}). Independence has a population of 111,806 in 1980 and 112,301 in 1990. The racial makeup of the city was 91.87% White, 2.59% African American, 0.70% Asian, 0.64% Native American, 0.46% Pacific Islander, 1.43% from other races, and 2.31% from two or more races. Hispanic or Latino of any race were 3.69% of the population.

There were 47,390 households, out of which 28.1% had children under the age of 18 living with them, 47.9% were married couples living together, 12.3% had a female householder with no husband present, and 35.5% were non-families. 30.1% of all households were made up of individuals, and 11.3% had someone living alone who was 65 years of age or older. The average household size was 2.37, and the average family size was 2.93.

In the city, the population was spread out, with 23.9% under the age of 18, 8.7% from 18 to 24, 28.9% from 25 to 44, 23.0% from 45 to 64, and 15.5% who were 65 years of age or older. The median age was 38 years. For every 100 females, there were 91.6 males. For every 100 females age 18 and over, there were 87.3 males.

The median income for a household in the city was $38,012, and the median income for a family was $45,876. Males had a median income of $34,138 versus $25,948 for females. The per capita income for the city was $19,384. About 6.4% of families and 8.6% of the population were below the poverty line, including 11.8% of those under age 18 and 6.7% of those age 65 or over.

=== Religion ===
Independence Temple

Independence played an important role in the early history of the Latter Day Saint movement and is home to the headquarters of several denominations of the Latter Day Saint movement, most notably the Community of Christ (formerly the Reorganized Church of Jesus Christ of Latter Day Saints), whose Temple is located there. Other Latter Day Saint denominations headquartered in the city include the Church of Christ (Temple Lot) and the Church of Jesus Christ (Cutlerite), among others. A number of Restoration Branches are also located in and around Independence, and the Church of Jesus Christ of Latter-day Saints maintains a visitor center in the town.

The Community of Christ has built a temple in Independence, and also maintains a large auditorium and other buildings nearby. The Church of Jesus Christ of Latter-day Saints operates a sizable visitors' center adjacent to the Community of Christ Temple, and across the street from the original Temple Lot designated by Joseph Smith in 1830. The Lot itself is occupied by a small white-frame church building that serves as the headquarters and local meeting house for the Church of Christ (Temple Lot).

There are five Catholic churches and two Episcopal churches in Independence.

One of the oldest churches in Independence is the First Presbyterian Church, founded in 1826. It was here in 1890 that Harry Truman first met Elizabeth Wallace. Truman eventually married her after his return from World War I in 1919.

== Economy ==
According to the town's 2016 Comprehensive Annual Financial Report, the top employers in the city are:

#	Employer	Employees
1	Independence School District	2,200
2	Northrop Grumman Innovation Systems	1,722
3	Centerpoint Medical Center	1,400
4	City of Independence	1,097
5	Government Employee Health Association	743
6	Rosewood Health Center at the Groves	444
7	Burd & Fletcher	274
8	Jackson County Circuit Court	274
9	Cable Dahmer Automotive	271
10	Unilever	260

== Arts and culture ==
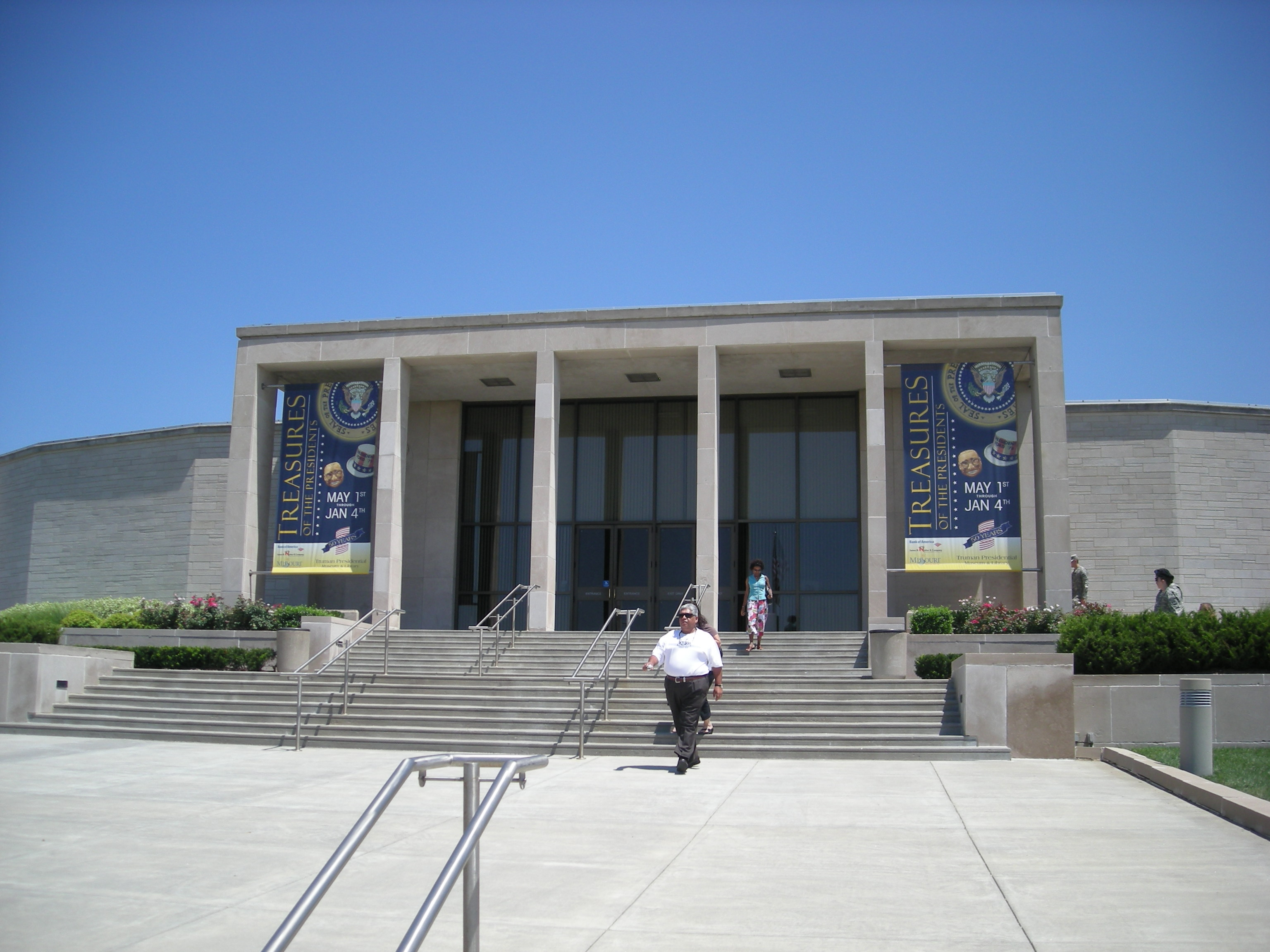
Harry S. Truman Presidential Library and Museum

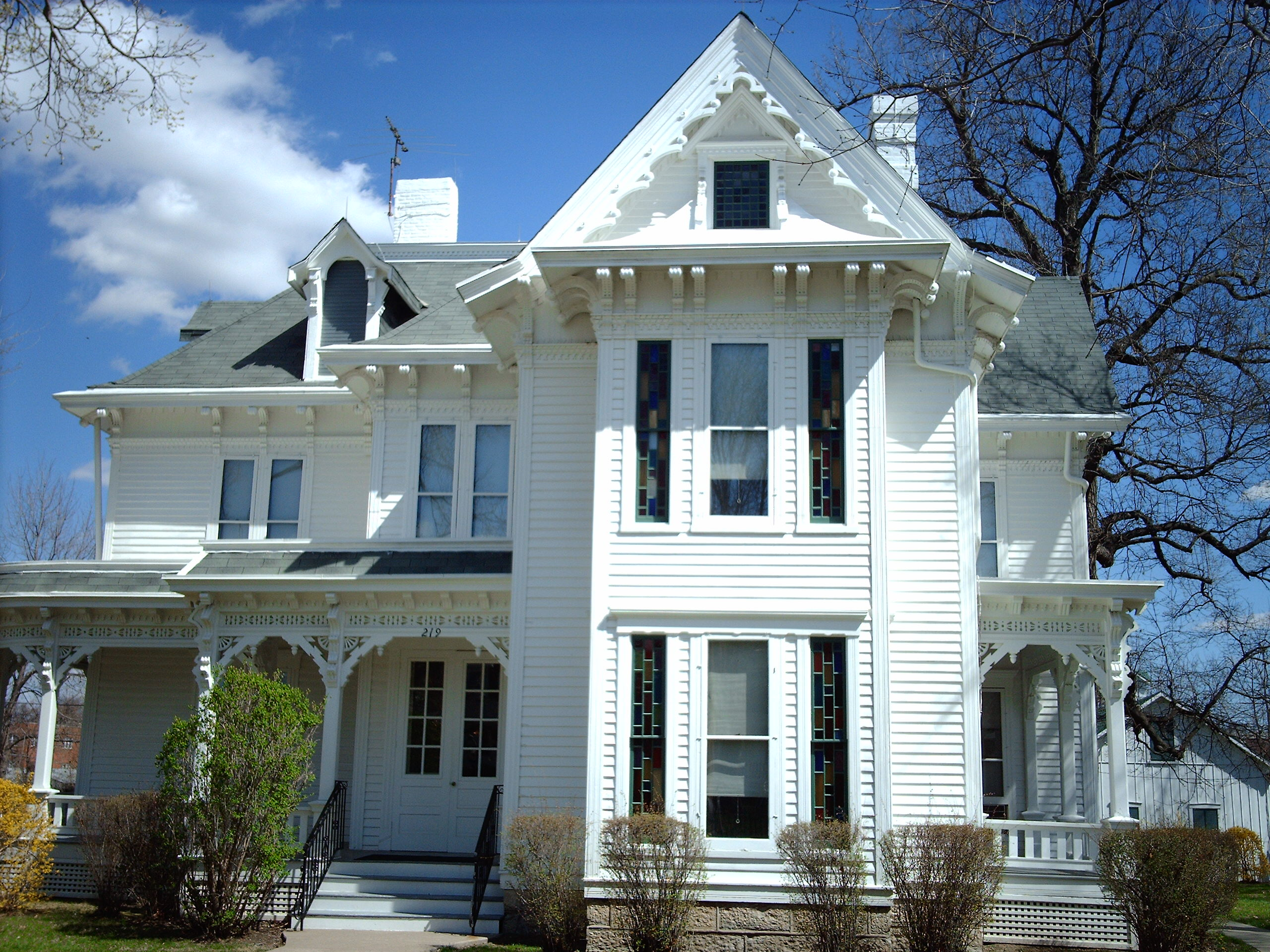
Truman's Independence home, now part of the Harry S. Truman National Historic Site

Santa-Cali-Gon Days is an annual Labor Day festival held in Independence intermittently since 1940 and continuously since 1973, celebrating the city's history as a starting point of three major frontier trails: the Santa Fe, California, and Oregon. Another popular annual festival is the Vaile Strawberry Festival, which is held on the first Saturday of June. The Independence Heritage Festival celebrates the city's heritage. The old main courthouse was modeled after Philadelphia's Independence Hall. This courthouse houses Harry S. Truman's former courtroom and office.

=== Museums ===
- The National Frontier Trails Museum is dedicated to the history of the Westward Expansion Trails and the settlement of the American West.
- The Harry S. Truman Presidential Library and Museum is the official library of the 33rd U.S. president.
- The Puppetry Arts Institute is a non-profit organization that has hundreds of puppets and marionettes, including a collection of remnants from the world's largest puppet factory which used to be in neighboring Kansas City.
- Harry S. Truman National Historic Site, the Truman home, was the home of the 33rd U.S. president. It is operated by the National Park Service.
- The Jackson County Jail and Marshal's House is a museum that preserves a former prison.
- Bingham-Waggoner Estate was the home of American Civil War artist George Caleb Bingham and later belonged to the Waggoner family, founders of the Waggoner-Gates Mill. It was built in 1852 along the Santa Fe Trail and renovated in the 1890s.
- Chicago and Alton Depot is a wooden depot which is believed to be the oldest two-story frame railroad depot remaining in Missouri. It was built in 1879 and serves as a railroad museum.
- Vaile Mansion is a thirty-one-room mansion built by frontier business tycoon Harvey Vaile in 1881.
- The Community of Christ International Headquarters is the world headquarters for the Community of Christ.
- The LDS Visitors Center describes the roles played by Latter-day Saints during the early history of Independence.

== Sports ==
Blue River Community College features a soccer program with a men's team, the Trailblazers, and a women's team, the Lady Trailblazers. The Cable Dahmer Arena is home of the Kansas City Mavericks, a minor-league hockey team in the ECHL. The arena is also the home of Kansas City Comets of the Major Arena Soccer League. Crysler Stadium is the home of the collegiate summer baseball Independence Veterans of the Mid-Plains League.

Local recreational sports teams include:

- Pop Warner Little Scholars
- American Legion Baseball
- Blue Valley Activity Center (BVAC)

== Government ==
The Independence City Council is made up of seven members. Four are elected to represent one of the city districts, and the other two are elected by the city as a whole. The City Mayor also sits on the City Council and serves as the "Head of Government" for the city, The Mayor can vote on legislation with the council but does not have the right to veto. Members serve a four-year term, beginning on January 1 following the election. The current mayor is Kevin King, elected in 2026.

The Independence Municipal Court is currently seated by two members. Judges are appointed by the City Mayor and serve a 4-year term. Judges may be reappointed for multiple terms by the Mayor or the City Council.

== Education ==
=== Primary and secondary ===
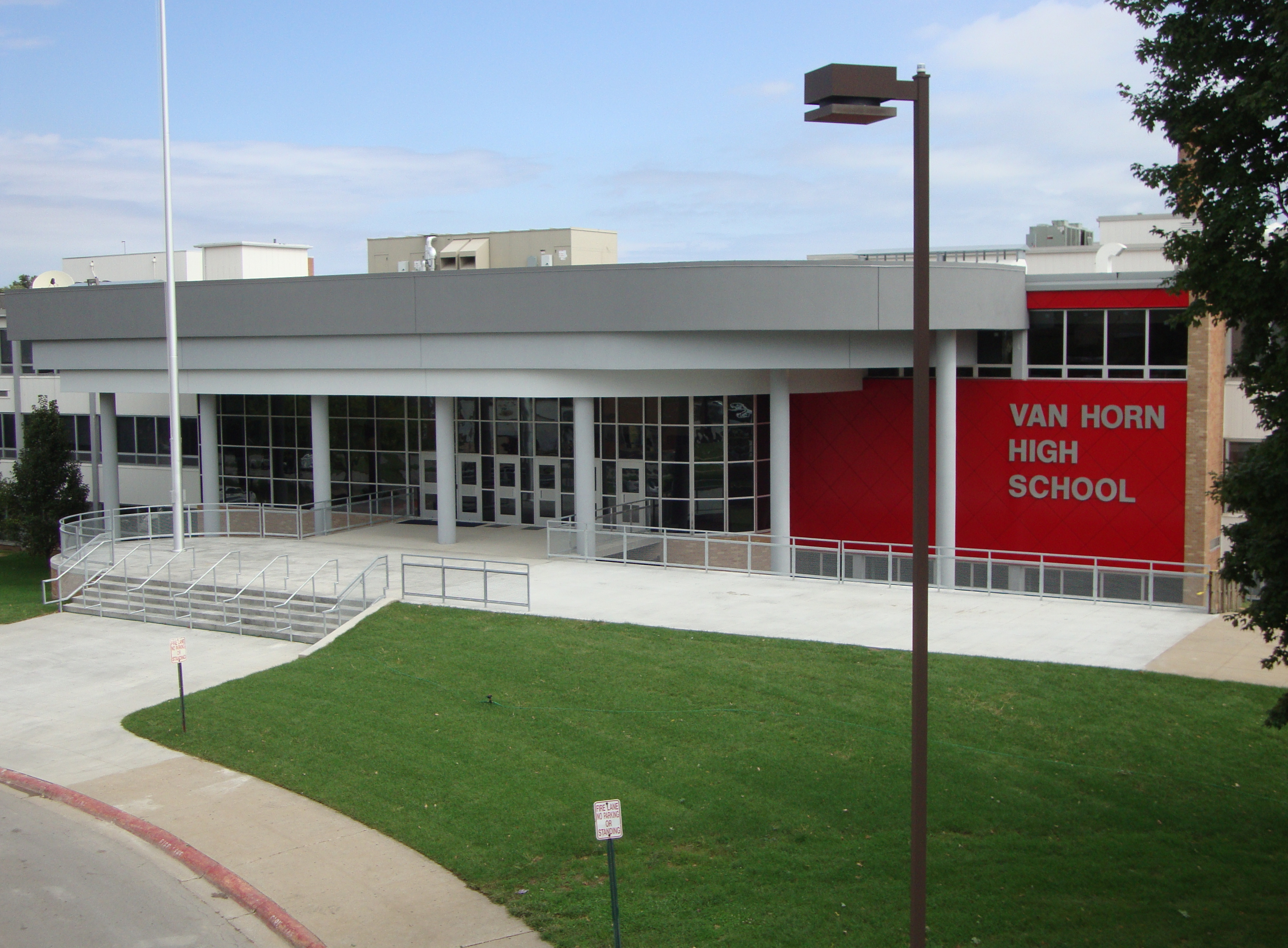
Van Horn High School

Four school districts have areas within the city: Independence, Blue Springs, Fort Osage Schools, and Raytown.

Prior to Fall 2008, parts of western Independence in the Van Horn feeder pattern resided in the Kansas City Public Schools, but all of these students are now part of the Independence school district.

Three public high schools are located within the city limits:

- Truman High School
- Van Horn High School
- William Chrisman High School

Two private high schools within the city limits:

- Center Place Restoration School
- Family Christian Academy
- Fort Osage High School is adjacent to but not inside the city limits.

Four public middle schools within the city limits:

- James Bridger Middle School
- Pioneer Ridge Middle School
- George Caleb Bingham Middle School
- Clifford H. Nowlin Middle School

=== Colleges and universities ===
- Blue River Community College, part of the Metropolitan Community College system.
  - The Independence, Fort Osage, Raytown, North Kansas City, and Kansas City Missouri districts are all in MCC's taxation area.
- Graceland University, Independence campus. Main campus is in Lamoni, Iowa.

=== Libraries ===
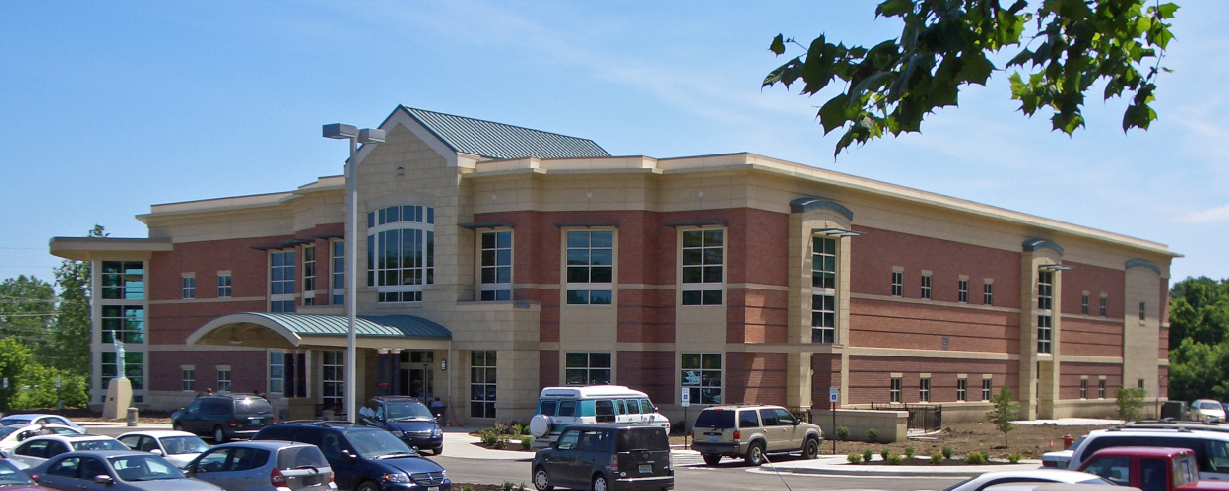
Midwest Genealogy Center

- Midwest Genealogy Center, the largest stand-alone public genealogy research library in America.
- The Center for the Study of the Korean War, the largest Korean War archive in the U.S., at Graceland University.
- Merrill J. Mattes Research Library, focused on the Overland Trails, and the settlement of the American West. Located at the National Frontier Trails Museum.
- Truman Library Research Center, at the Harry S. Truman Presidential Library and Museum.
- Jackson County Historical Society Archives & Research Library.
- Mid-Continent Public Library operates three general library branches in Independence.
- Kansas City Public Library operates the Trails West Branch in Independence.

== Media ==
=== Newspapers ===
- The Examiner, Eastern Jackson County's daily newspaper. It is also referred to as The Independence Examiner.

=== Television ===
- KSMO-TV 62 – My Network TV affiliate operates a transmitter tower in western Independence, south of MO-12/Truman Rd.

=== Magazines ===
- Space and Time, speculative fiction magazine

== Infrastructure ==
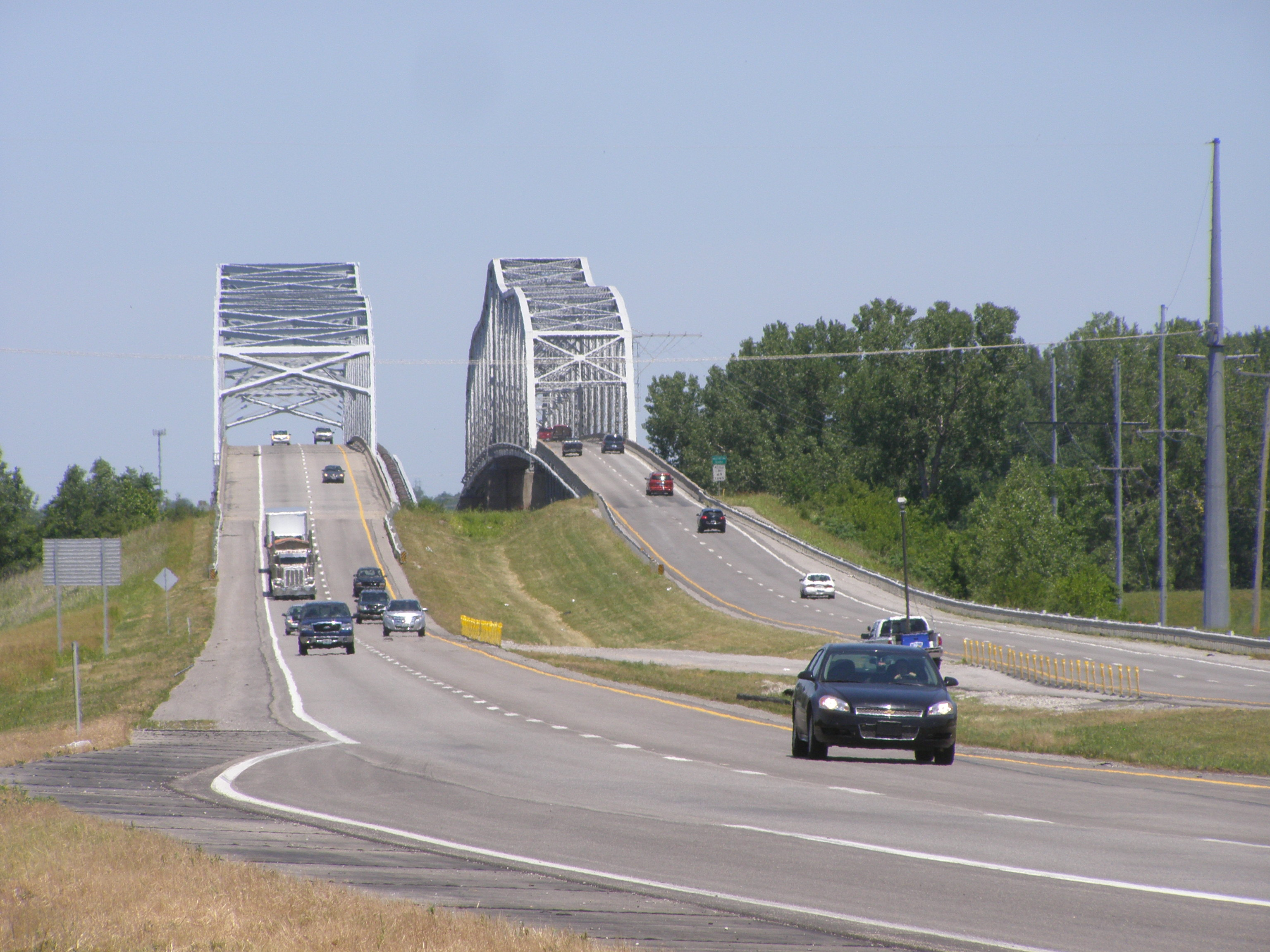
The Liberty Bend Bridge carries Missouri Route 291 across the Missouri River.

=== Highways and roads ===
- Interstate 70 – Major east–west interstate highway, connecting Independence to Kansas City, Columbia, and St. Louis.
- Interstate 470 – Follows MO-291 starting at 39th St./I-70 south into Lee's Summit.
- Interstate 435 – Runs just outside the western city limits, between Independence and Kansas City.
- U.S. Route 24 – A major east/west U.S. highway that links Independence with Kansas City and Buckner, and forms part of Independence's northern border with Sugar Creek. It passes through the Fairmount Business District, by the Truman Presidential Library and Museum, by William Chrisman High School, and north of the Independence Square. Parts of U.S. 24 are known as Winner Road, and Independence Avenue.
- U.S. Route 40 – Connects Independence with Lee's Summit, Lake Tapawingo, and Blue Springs, and forms part of Independence's southern border with Kansas City.
- Route 7 – Links U.S. 24 and Twyman Road (near Fort Osage High School) with Blue Springs, and passes by the Lake City Army Ammunition Plant.
- Route 12 is a short highway that connects the Independence Square to I-435 in Kansas City, and is commonly known as Truman Rd.
- Route 78 is an east–west highway that links Kansas City to MO-7, near the Lake City Army Ammunition Plant. Parts of MO-78 are known as 23rd St. (formerly E. Alton St.), and Lake City-Buckner Road.
- Route 291 – A minor north–south freeway, once designated as U.S. Route 71 Bypass, that links Independence to Lee's Summit, Sugar Creek, and Liberty. The Liberty Bend Bridge carries the highway across the Missouri River. I-470 carries the highway from I-70 south into Lee's Summit. Part of the former alignment, known as Old 71 Bypass, is a street in the Bass Pro area.
- Truman Road is a major arterial street that connects Independence with downtown Kansas City, and eastern unincorporated Jackson County. It passes by Van Horn High School, through the Maywood Business District, by President Harry S. Truman's house, and the Independence Square. Truman Road enters Independence with MO-12, and exits with State Route FF.

=== Hospital ===
- Centerpoint Medical Center

=== Transportation ===
- Amtrak Station
- Kansas City Area Transportation Authority (KCATA)

=== Utilities ===
Independence Power & Light (IPL) is a local electric power plant owned and operated by the city. It was established in 1901 and has undergone many changes and upgrades. One change was moving from the old Dodgion Street plant (where the Roger T. Sermon Center stands now) to the Blue Valley Plant near Truman Rd. and MO-78/Lake City-Buckner Rd. IPL also draws power from other sources: the Missouri City Power Plant, and the Kansas City Power and Light Company (KCP&L), through several 69 and 161 kilovolt transmission interconnections. IPL has an "Out of Sight" power line burial program. After signing an agreement with TradeWind Energy in July 2008, IPL will begin purchasing annually 15 megawatts of renewable energy from the Smoky Hills Wind Farm (a wind turbine facility) in Kansas.

== Sister city ==
In 1978, Independence gained sister city status with Higashimurayama, Tokyo, Japan. Higashimurayama Street is south of Truman Rd. between Memorial Dr. and Lynn St., between City Hall and the Independence Square. This twinning is commemorated by a Zen garden, near E Lexington Ave. and Memorial Dr.

== Notable people ==
- Forrest "Phog" Allen – University of Kansas basketball coach; inductee, National Collegiate Basketball Hall of Fame; attended high school in Independence
- John B. Arrington – Utah state legislator
- Rudy Bears – professional mixed martial artist
- George Caleb Bingham – 19th-century painter
- James L. Boldridge – African-American horse trainer
- Jim Butcher – New York Times bestselling writer
- Teresa Carpenter – Pulitzer Prize–winning journalist
- Margaret Truman Daniel – novelist; daughter of Harry and Bess Truman; born in Independence
- Curt Dougherty – councilman and state representative
- Jim Eisenreich – Major League Baseball player; lived in Independence
- Fatal1ty (Jonathan Wendel) – professional e-sports player
- E. J. Gaines – football player for the Missouri Tigers and the National Football League's Los Angeles Rams
- Marla Hanson (born 1961) – screenwriter, ex-model; victim of a slashing attack by two other men hired by her landlord in 1986
- Paul Henning – television producer and screenwriter; created the television series The Beverly Hillbillies, Green Acres, Petticoat Junction; born in Independence
- Sam Hildreth – thoroughbred horse trainer; born in Independence
- Daniel G. Hill – sociologist
- Arliss Howard – film and television actor (films including Full Metal Jacket, The Lost World: Jurassic Park, Natural Born Killers, Moneyball and television series including Rubicon, Medium); born in Independence
- Jared Huffman – congressman (CA-2), Democrat; born in Independence and graduated from William Chrisman High School there
- Sharon Kinne – serial killer
- Betty Lennox – former player for the Women's National Basketball Association
- David McCullough – writer, including historian; lived in Independence while writing and researching Truman, his Pulitzer Prize–winning biography of Harry Truman
- Russ Morman – Major League Baseball outfielder and first baseman, coach; born in Independence
- John Noland – black Confederate scout who served with Quantrill's Raiders; buried in Woodlawn Cemetery
- Ralph Peer – record producer; inductee, Country Music Hall of Fame; born in Independence
- Austin Petersen – writer; 2016 U.S. presidential candidate (Libertarian Party)
- Chris Pitman – musician; Guns N' Roses keyboardist
- Albert Pujols – St. Louis Cardinals first baseman; attended high school in Independence
- Ginger Rogers – Academy Award–winning actress of musicals, dramas, and comedies; screen dancing partner of Fred Astaire; born in Independence
- Charles E. Spahr – chief executive officer, Standard Oil of Ohio
- David Stover – NASCAR driver
- Rick Sutcliffe – Major League Baseball pitcher and television commentator; born in Independence
- Tech N9ne (Aaron Yates) – rapper; vice president, Strange Music
- George M. Todd – Confederate partisan ranger; buried in Woodlawn Cemetery
- Bess Truman – 33rd first lady of the United States; born in Independence
- Harry S. Truman – 34th vice president of the United States and 33rd president of the United States; raised in Independence
- Ron Wallace – country-music singer
- Madisen Ward and the Mama Bear – folk singers
- Margaret Weis – fantasy novelist
- Cathay Williams – female black American Civil War soldier
- Harlene Wood – songwriter and actress; known as Jill Jackson-Miller when she co-composed the international peace anthem "Let There Be Peace on Earth"
- Hiram Young – self-freed slave turned wagon-building entrepreneur for the Oregon Trail; "Kansas City's First Colored Man of Means"

== See also ==
- Independence Police Department
- Route of the Oregon Trail
- St. Joseph, Missouri
