= Commission of Inquiry into the appointment of the Commissioner of Fiji Independent Commission Against Corruption =

- Date: 31 October 2024 – 1 May 2025
- Duration: 6 months
- Also known as: COI report
- Type: Commission of inquiry
- Commissioner: Justice David E. Ashton-Lewis
- Counsel assisting: Janet Mason

The Commission of Inquiry into the appointment of the Commissioner of Fiji Independent Commission Against Corruption was established by the Fiji Government in 2024 to inquire into the legality of the appointment of Barbara Malimali as FICAC Commissioner.

The Commission of Inquiry was established pursuant to the Commissions of Inquiry Act 1946. Justice David E. Ashton-Lewis, a senior Australian jurist and Supreme Court judge in Fiji was tasked to head the inquiry. It was established after concerns were raised over Malimali’s appointment to head FICAC, which was investigating her for abuse of office allegations. It escalated to Malimali being arrested on her first day of work by former FICAC Deputy Commissioner Frances Pulewai who later resigned the same day. On the 31st of October 2024, Prime Minister Sitiveni Rabuka stated that President Ratu Wiliame Katonivere had signed off for the Commission of Inquiry to proceed. Rabuka had further stated that that a Commission of Inquiry is the most appropriate and impartial means to address allegations surrounding the work of FICAC.

On the 29th of May 2025, Fiji President Ratu Naiqama Lalabalavu had suspended Barbara Malimali as FICAC commissioner following the recommendations of the Commission of Inquiry report. Malimali had been reported to the police to investigate allegations laid in the report. The Fiji Law Society raised concerns that the suspension did not go through the Judicial Services Commission and it may be challenged in court. The following day, Prime Minister Rabuka had dismissed Attorney General Graham Leung in regards to the handling of the appointment of Malimali as FICAC commissioner.

On the 9th of June 2025, the Fiji Times reported Commissioner Ashton-Lewis had stated he found nine people including cabinet ministers had either lied under oath or obstructed the course of justice during the Commission of Inquiry proceedings. Commissioner Ashton-Lewis further stated he found a “wannabe prime minister” to be one of the nine persons he has implicated in the COI report. Commissioner Ashton-Lewis made his remarks while being interviewed on the 29th of May 2025 by the Australia-based Gold Coast radio show, 4CRB.

== See also ==
- Corruption in Fiji
- Fiji Independent Commission Against Corruption
- Second Rabuka government
