= Fiji Consumers Association =

The Fiji Consumers Association (FCA) is a non-profit, voluntary civil society group in the Fiji Islands. The association is registered under Fiji's Charitable Trust Act and is principally based in Suva, Fiji's capital city. The FCA is the only non-government and voluntary consumer organisation in Fiji, and actively participates in activities of the consumer movement in Fiji under the leadership of the statutory consumer agency - Consumer Council of Fiji.

== Office bearers ==
- Subhash Appana - president. Appana is an academic based at the University of the South Pacific. Appana is also a well-known political commentator and regular contributor to the local newspaper columns in Fiji.
- Mr Paras Sukul - secretary. Mr Sukul is the association's longest serving officer and is the principal contact persons of the association. He was formerly one of the founding members of Nasinu Town Council, Fiji's largest municipality in terms of residential population.
- Mr Baij Maharaj - treasurer. Mr Maharaj is a career banker and former executive of the Fiji Housing Authority.
- Other executive committee members are: Mr Francis Waqa Sokonibogi, Ms Basant Swann and Mr Manoa Taletawa.

=== Membership ===
Membership is open to all Fiji citizens who are concerned about consumer issues and are willing to accept the objectives of the association. It currently boasts 150 financial members.

== Aims and objectives ==
The principal aim of the association, as outlined in its constitution, is: to collect and disseminate information of benefit to consumers; and in doing so to advance the interests of its subscribing members and those of consumers generally.

Objectives The objectives of the association shall be as follows :-

a) To carry out, commission or promote research, testing and investigation into matters of consumers interest and concern; and to disseminate and resulting information, advice and warnings, including publication of reports, magazines, pamphlets, boos and any other communications.

(b) To improve and maintain the standards of goods and commodities sold, and service rendered to the public.

(c) To persuade the Government and the trading community to make such changes to the laws and practices of the marketplace as will remove disadvantages suffered by consumers and promote better and more just treatment of consumers.

(d) To promote and advance public knowledge of matters affecting consumers, and also the education of consumers of all ages.

(e) To continue to apply the basic principles of its antecedent body on impartiality, independence and avoidance of conflict of interests.

(f) To liaise with and assist other organizations in Fiji and overseas in the pursuit of the objects of the association.

(g) To develop and maintain a collection of library materials relating to consumer matters.

(h) To provide such amenities, services, and facilities for association members and consumers as the executive committee thinks fit, whether of a trading, commercial or of personal nature.

(i) To trade or carry on any type of commercial, financial or business activities with the purpose of generating funds only for the furtherance of its aims and objects.

(j) To do all those things which may lawfully be done, and which in the opinion of the executive committee are for the direct or indirect benefit of the association members and Consumers generally, or are incidental or conducive to the attainment of the foregoing objects.

=== Some recent activities ===
Fiji Banking Services (2011) - The association has participated actively in community lobbying for an inquiry into Fiji's banking services sector. It was part of a group of NGOs led by the Consumer Council of Fiji that made a submission to Fiji's competition watchdog, the Fiji Commerce Commission to undertake an inquiry into banking services and the Fiji financial sector in general. The FCA also submitted its written submission on banking services in Fiji.

Stance on mobile phones health effects - The association has been lobbying for the Fiji government to address the possible negative health effects of mobile phones. The association has noted that with the deregulation of the industry and competitive retail prices, consumer use of mobile phones Fiji will most likely double in coming years.

Asserting consumers' rights - In its News Years 2011 message, the Fiji Consumers Association called on consumers in Fiji "to take a more active role this year by asserting their rights and being vigilant on unscrupulous and dishonest trade practices." The association actively lobbies for consumer empowerment in Fiji in light of the economic changes affecting the small island nation.
