= James L. Boldridge =

American horse trainer

James L. Boldridge (December 17, 1868 – May 18, 1918) was a famous horse trainer in the late 19th century and early 20th century, and is the only other African-American other than Hiram Young buried in an Independence, Missouri cemetery along with other honored city leaders/pioneers, at a time when African-American burials were segregated.

"James Boldridge – Boldridge was among the top horse trainers in Independence, and his stable was located behind his house at 212 E. Maple Ave. Boldridge's funeral took place at St. Paul A.M.E. Church in 1917( [sic]). His horse remained without a rider in the funeral procession."
