= Corruption in Fiji =

Corruption in Fiji describes the prevention and occurrence of corruption in Fiji. Fiji has generally maintained a relatively favorable reputation in addressing corruption compared to other Pacific Island nations. Over the past two decades, numerous instances of public fund mismanagement have been reported, alongside cases of bribery, embezzlement, and abuse of power. The Fiji Independent Commission Against Corruption (FICAC), the government body tasked with tackling corruption, has been at the forefront of these efforts. By 2023, FICAC had recorded 114 complaints directly linked to corrupt practices, reflecting the ongoing need for robust measures to combat corruption and uphold public trust.

== Notable corruption cases ==
One of Fiji's most significant corruption cases involved the National Bank of Fiji (NBF) and the threat of its financial collapse in the 1990s due to poor lending practices. The bank was accused of favoring privileged groups, resulting in bad debts amounting to approximately $200 million. Originally established as a government-owned institution, the NBF expanded rapidly after the 1987 coups, with loans disproportionately approved for privileged groups, particularly indigenous Fijians, often without proper safeguards. The staggering amount of bad debt already amounted to 8% of Fiji's GDP. This incident burdened taxpayers as the Fijian government was forced to pay for the losses.

Another instance that highlighted the severity of corruption in Fiji was the controversy implicating the Ministry of Agriculture's Affirmative Action plan for indigenous Fijians and Rotumans in 2000. The funds intended for the enhancement of agricultural participation among these identified groups were misused. The majority of the cases of lost funds, the Permanent Secretary, his deputy, and Principal Accounts Officer approved applications without the necessary assessments and evaluation by experts. An audit also revealed mismanagement including a lack of authorization systems, poor planning, and absence of performance monitoring. Mismanagement and the lack of monitoring and control were seen as deliberate attempt by the Ministry to violate standard government procurement procedures.

The case of Bobby Jitendra Maharaj, the former CEO of the Fiji Commerce Commission, exemplified the extent of corruption involving high-ranking public officials. He was accused of instructing an employee to falsify information on an inspection form, falsely indicating that a company had undergone an inspection when, in reality, no such inspection had occurred. This incident underscores the vulnerabilities in regulatory oversight and the potential abuse of authority by senior officials. He was acquitted by the Magistrates Court in 2020, but the FICAC has appealed the decision. A similar case of corruption through the falsification of documents emerged in 2019. It involved Nanise Lacanivalu, a former executive officer of the Macuata Provincial Office. During her tenure from May 1 to September 30, 2019, she created duplicate receipts to manipulate financial records, allowing her to wrongfully enrich herself from the Office of the Provincial Administrator, despite knowing she did not have the right to receive such funds.

== Anti-corruption measures ==
Fiji's corruption performance has improved since 2011. Prior to this period there is lack of transparency in government processes due to self-censoring media, the absence of parliamentary oversight, and the lack of checks and balances. The improvement is attributed to the string of initiatives that the country has adopted to weed out the problem. As part of a "clean-up campaign", the FICAC was established in 2007 and is given the authority to investigate acts of corruption. The agency has also improved transparency, rewarded whistleblowers, and prosecuted perpetrators. Fiji also ratified the United Nations Convention against Corruption in May 2008. Fiji's Public Service Commission also created a special unit to investigate corruption in the bureaucracy. The Financial Reporting Transaction Act was also passed to counter money-laundering and this entailed the establishment of a Financial Intelligence Unit to monitor and implement the law.

The measures adopted by the government, including those that are part of its commitment to the UNCAC, allowed Fiji significant gains. In 2013, for example, it posted its largest decline in corruption (48% of the respondents) versus selected comparator countries in a survey conducted by Transparency International's Global Corruption Barometer.

== International rankings ==
In Transparency International's 2025 Corruption Perceptions Index, which scored 182 countries on a scale from 0 ("highly corrupt") to 100 ("very clean"), Fiji scored 55. When ranked by score, Fiji ranked 49th among the 180 countries in the Index, where the country ranked first is perceived to have the most honest public sector. For comparison with regional scores, the best score among those countries of the Asia Pacific region that appeared in the Index (Note: Afghanistan, Australia, Bangladesh, Bhutan, Brunei Darussalam, Cambodia, China, Fiji, Hong Kong, India, Indonesia, Japan, North Korea, South Korea, Laos, Malaysia, Maldives, Mongolia, Myanmar, Nepal, New Zealand, Pakistan, Papua New Guinea, Philippines, Singapore, Solomon Islands, Sri Lanka, Taiwan, Thailand, Timor-Leste, Vanuatu, Vietnam) was 84, the average score was 45 and the worst score was 15. For comparison with worldwide scores, the best score was 89 (ranked 1), the average score was 42, and the worst score was 9 (ranked 181, in a two-way tie).
