= Family Christian Academy =

Family Christian Academy may refer to:

- Family Christian Academy (Missouri)
- Family Christian Academy (Texas)
