= Centerpoint Medical Center =

Coordinates: 39.0496°N 94.3496°W

- HCA Midwest Division

Geography
- Location: 19600 East 39th Street, Independence, Missouri, United States

Organization
- Care system: HCA Midwest Division

Services
- Emergency department: Level II Trauma certification
- Beds: 285

Helipads
- Helipad: Yes

Links
- Website: centerpointmedical.com
- Lists: Hospitals in Missouri

Centerpoint Medical Center is a hospital located in Independence, Missouri at 19600 East 39th Street. It is part of the HCA Midwest Division.

== Background ==
Centerpoint opened in May 2007 and is the newest hospital in eastern Jackson County. It replaces Medical Center of Independence and Independence Regional Health Center in a new location. The hospital is at 39th & Little Blue Parkway just off of I-70 and east of the Independence Center. Its campus includes the medical center itself and a medical office building/outpatient services center connected to the hospital on the west side of the hospital.
