= Center Place Restoration School =

Private school in Missouri, United States

Coordinates: 39.096066°N 94.425956°W

- Independence, Jackson County, Missouri; United States

Information
- Religious affiliation: Restoration branches
- Established: 1992; 34 years ago
- Grades: K-12

Center Place Restoration School is a private K-12 in Independence, Missouri, in the Kansas City metropolitan area. Opened in 1992, the school is associated with the Restoration Branches movement formed in the 1980s by members of the Reorganized Church of Jesus Christ of Latter Day Saints (RLDS, now the Community of Christ).

== History ==
A group of parents established Center Place Restoration School in 1992. The school had acquired the property of the Waldo Avenue Baptist Church in 1991 so the school could be established there. The preschool was scheduled to be established in November 1991, while the K-12 school was scheduled to be established in September 1992.

The initial enrollment was around 125. By fall 1995, the figure was over 250.

In 2003 Center Place Restoration School and Oak Valley Country Day School merged. The Oak Valley campus was renamed to Center Place Restoration School Oak Grove.
