= Federal Customs Authority =

United Arab Emirates Federal Customs Authority (FCA)
- الهيئة الاتحادية للجمارك

Agency overview
- Jurisdiction: UAE
- Headquarters: Abu Dhabi
- Agency executive: said Khalid Al Bustani, (Deputy Director General)
- Parent agency: Ministry of Finance
- Website: www.customs.ae

The United Arab Emirates Federal Customs Authority is an Emirati governmental authority concerned with drawing customs policy in cooperation with customs administrations, preparing unified legislation to regulate customs work, and supervising implementation of it by customs administrations and related government authorities, and protecting the State from revenue fraud and smuggling operations in cooperation and coordination with competent authorities.

== Establishment ==
Operational procedures for the establishment of the FCA commenced with the approval of the Cabinet through resolutions no. 617 / 7 for the year 2001 and 157 / 12 for the year 2002, mandating the Ministry of Finance and the Ministry of Industry to prepare a consultative study on the establishment of the FCA, and authorizing the ministry to follow up the implementation of necessary procedures and measures. On May 28, 2002, the Ministerial Committee of the Cooperation Council for the Arab States of the Gulf, chaired by Sheikh Hamdan bin Rashid Al Maktoum, Deputy Ruler of Dubai and Minister of Finance and Industry, mandated the Ministry of Finance and Industry to commence preparation procedures of a draft law on establishment of the authority and prepare the Common Customs Law of the State. The Ministry of Finance and Industry fully formulated Authority Draft Law No. 1 of the year 2003, and it was then submitted to the competent Ministerial Committee, then the Cabinet, and then the Supreme Council of the Federation of the UAE. Hence, these efforts culminated in the issuance of the Federal Decree in Law No. (1) for the year 2003 by Sheikh Zayed Bin Sultan Al Nahyan, then President of the State, regarding establishment of the Federal Customs Authority.

== Function and responsibility ==
Federal Law No. (1) for the year 2003 regarding establishment of the Federal Customs Authority (FCA) in the UAE defined the primary Functions and responsibilities of FCA on the basis that it is the authority concerned with drawing customs policy in cooperation with customs administrations, preparing unified legislations to regulate customs work, and supervising implementation of it by customs administrations and related government authorities, and protecting the State from cheating and smuggling operations in cooperation and coordination with competent authorities. In addition, Article (5) of the said law precisely determined the jurisdictions of FCA in the following points:

1. Setting the general policy of customs affairs in the State in cooperation with customs administration and supervising implementation thereof.
2. Proposing draft laws related to customs affairs and supervision of its implementation.
3. Regulating customs works in the State.
4. Proposing dues of custom services provided that it be ratified through a resolution by the Council of Ministers.
5. Preparing regulations, rules, procedures, terminology and customs applicable in the State.
6. Preparing rules and regulations for combating smuggling and fraud related to customs affairs, and supervising and controlling their implementation.
7. Coordinating with customs administrations regarding unification of joint customs services among customs administrations.
8. Control and inspection of tariff application and customs procedures, standardization of paper documents and customs data, and setting a plan for joint development and training.
9. Collection and dissemination of data, information and statistics related in nature to customs in the State.#
10. Representing the State in Arab, regional and international meetings and conferences which activities relate to customs affairs and following up the implementation of resolutions issued therein, in cooperation with competent authorities in the State.
11. Implementation of entry procedures into the State in the customs union of the GCC States, in Arab States of the Persian Gulf, or in any other customs unions.
12. Investment of the Authority funds.
13. Any other works assigned to the Authority by the Cabinet.

It is clear through these jurisdictions that the role and functions of the authority ramify to include the following pivots:

- Economic, financial and social side represented on the basis that the authority is a major player in whatever is related to resolutions on import and export of goods and merchandise, as well as customs dues, and consequent economic, financial and social effects.
- The role of security and oversight represented in monitoring entry and exit of goods, merchandise and the like, and hence protection of the country and its people from any health or security threats, and also protection of national industry from forged and duplicate good. The security role is not limited to protection of the inside only, as some people may imagine, but it rather transcends it to protection of the outside and neighboring countries through inspection of goods exported to it and exchange of information about it, along with similar procedures.
- The legal and legislative role, through formulation of laws and regulations closely or distantly related to the movement of trade with the outside world.
- The service role, through offering modern customs services to individuals, governments and business organizations (companies), in a way that brings about welfare for those individuals, not to mention enhancing business opportunities for companies and assisting them in opening up new prospects for business, expansion and growth.
- Regional and international cooperation, whether in trade negotiations or in issues of regionally and internationally joint economic cooperation.
- Statistical role through collection of data and information related in nature to customs, knowing that undoubtedly such information has its own economic, financial and social bearings.
- Investment role through investing the authority funds in projects and ideas that maximize the yield of it.

== Mission ==
To develop policies and customs legislation and oversee the implementation and effective participation of the international trade support and combat fraud and smuggling.

== Strategic goals ==
- Elevation of work methods in the authority and preparation of specialized cadres and expertise.
- Elevation of customs work in the State and highlighting the leading role of UAE customs on regional and international levels.
- Protecting the State from smuggling and cheating operations in cooperation and coordination with competent authorities.

== Strategic objectives ==
- Building the capacity of the FCA to ensure performance quality in administrative and customs work.
- Unifying, developing and improving customs procedures in the State.
- Unifying, developing and improving customs examination and inspection procedures in the State to combat smuggling and fraud
- Guaranteeing implementation of the State's obligations, locally, regionally and internationally, in local customs administrations.
- Highlighting and enhancing the pioneering role of UAE customs on local, regional and international levels.
- The authority's supporting its partners through consultations and studies on customs affairs.
