= Consumer Council of Fiji =

Fijian lobbying agency

- Founded: 1976
- Founder: Parliament of Fiji 1976
- Type: Statutory body
- Purpose: Consumer protection
- Location: Suva, Fiji
- Origins: Established under statute Consumer Council of Fiji Act 1976
- Method: Advocacy, education, media, campaigning, complaints handling, public lobbying
- Employees: 20 full time
- Website: consumersfiji.org

The Consumer Council of Fiji is a statutory consumer agency that promotes and lobbies for consumer rights and interests in the Fiji Islands.

== Establishment ==
The council was established under an Act of the Fiji Parliament - Consumer Council of Fiji Act 1976 . The Council became operational on 16 February 1977. One of its principal functions was handling consumer complaints. Its enforcement functions were removed in 1992 under the Consumer Council of Fiji Act (Amendment) Decree 1992. The council has its head office in Suva, the capital of Fiji. Although the council is funded by a direct annual government grant, it operates independently of the Fiji government bureaucratic machinery. The Council receives an annual grant from the Government and supplements the grant with funds from donor agencies such as the European Union and Australian aid agency, AusAID. It also receives support from Consumers International, the global consumer organisation and partner consumer groups in the developed countries of which it is a member of.

== Board ==
The council is governed by a board, currently with a membership of four headed by chairman, Raman Dahia, a businessman. The board is appointed by the Ministry of Trade & Industry (previously Ministry of Commerce) and is required to be representative of a cross-section of the community. The board appoints the council's chief executive (CEO) The current chief executive officer of the Council is Seema Shandil who heads the day-to-day operations and functions of the council. The CEO and managers report to the board on a quarterly basis or when requested to by the board.

Current board members

- Raman Dahia (Chairman)
- Vimal Kumar
- Rosarine Lagi
- Mohammed Gani
- Elizabeth Jane Algar
- Arunesh Chand

== Offices ==
The Council's head office is located at 4 Carnavon Street, Suva. While the head office covers the overall operations and functions of the council, it is responsible for services for Fiji's Eastern/Central division, the island country's most populous geographic area. Two other offices cover the other geo-administrative divisions: one based in Lautoka (Fiji's second city) covering the Western Division, while the second office based in Labasa, looks after services in Fiji's Northern Division. In total there are about 20 full-time staff who serve a population of more than 800,000 people.

== Functions and jurisdiction ==
While being perceived as the principal agency on consumer rights and interests, the council has no regulatory or enforcement powers. Its enforcement powers were removed in 1992 and transferred to then newly created Department of Fair Trading & Consumer Affairs (absorbed into the Fiji Commerce Commission as of October 2010) The council's role is now limited to consumer rights advocacy, mediation, advisory and information. One of its main daily functions is to receive consumer complaints and institute mediation between traders and aggrieved consumers. The council regularly advocates for consumer rights using the media, community/school visits, mobile information units, public forums, lobbying of government ministries and other means. It also conducts campaigns on specific consumer issues. For example, an ongoing campaign on restaurant grading began in 2008, aimed at improving hygiene, health and safety conditions of restaurants in Fiji's urban centres. The Council is the statutory representative of consumers in Fiji, in other words, its representation of consumers and their rights and interest is sanctioned by law.

=== Functions under the Consumer Council of Fiji Act ===
- advising the Minister on matters affecting the interest of consumers
- making representations to the Government or to any other person on issues affecting the interest of consumers and to give evidence at any investigation or inquiry relating to such issues
- collecting, collating and disseminating information on matters affecting the interest of consumers; includes the publication of reports, magazines, pamphlets, booklets and any other publications
- advising and assisting consumers on matters affecting their interests
- receiving, handling and investigating consumer complaints

== International affiliations ==
=== Consumers International ===
The Consumer Council of Fiji is a full member of Consumers International (CI), the international federation of consumer organizations based in London. The Council has been a member of CI since 1989 and is the only consumer group in the South Pacific that is actively involved in CI's international activities on consumer rights and interests. In 2010, the Council celebrated World Consumer Rights Day with the theme "Our Money, Our Rights" in which it commenced a campaign to highlight what it considered unfair trade practices by Fiji's banks and financial institutions.

=== COPOLCO ===
The Council is a member of COPOLCO, the Committee on Consumer Policy of the International Organization for Standardization (ISO)

== Local/national affiliations and consultative work ==
The Council's status as the statutory representative of consumers in Fiji has made it an important partner or stakeholder in various Fiji consultative and policy-making bodies. The Council is often consulted on by policymakers and industry groups on matters affecting consumers in Fiji.

Some of the consultative groups that the Council is a member of are:

- Trade and Standards Advisory Council (TSAC) of the Ministry of Industry and Trade.
- Central Board of Health (Ministry of Health)
- Fiji National Codex Committee
- Food Task Force - Technical Advisory Group (Ministry of Health)
- Fiji Medicinal Products Board
- National Industry Working Group (NIWG) of Telecommunications Authority of Fiji
- Reserve Bank of Fiji Complaints Management Forum
- National Biosafety Group
- Fiji Pharmacy Profession Board
