= Family Christian Academy (Missouri) =

Private school in Missouri, U.S.

Coordinates: 39.090389°N 94.437457°W

Family Christian Academy is a private Christian school in Independence, Missouri, in the Kansas City metropolitan area. The school serves grades Kindergarten through 12.
