= Liberty Bend Bridge =

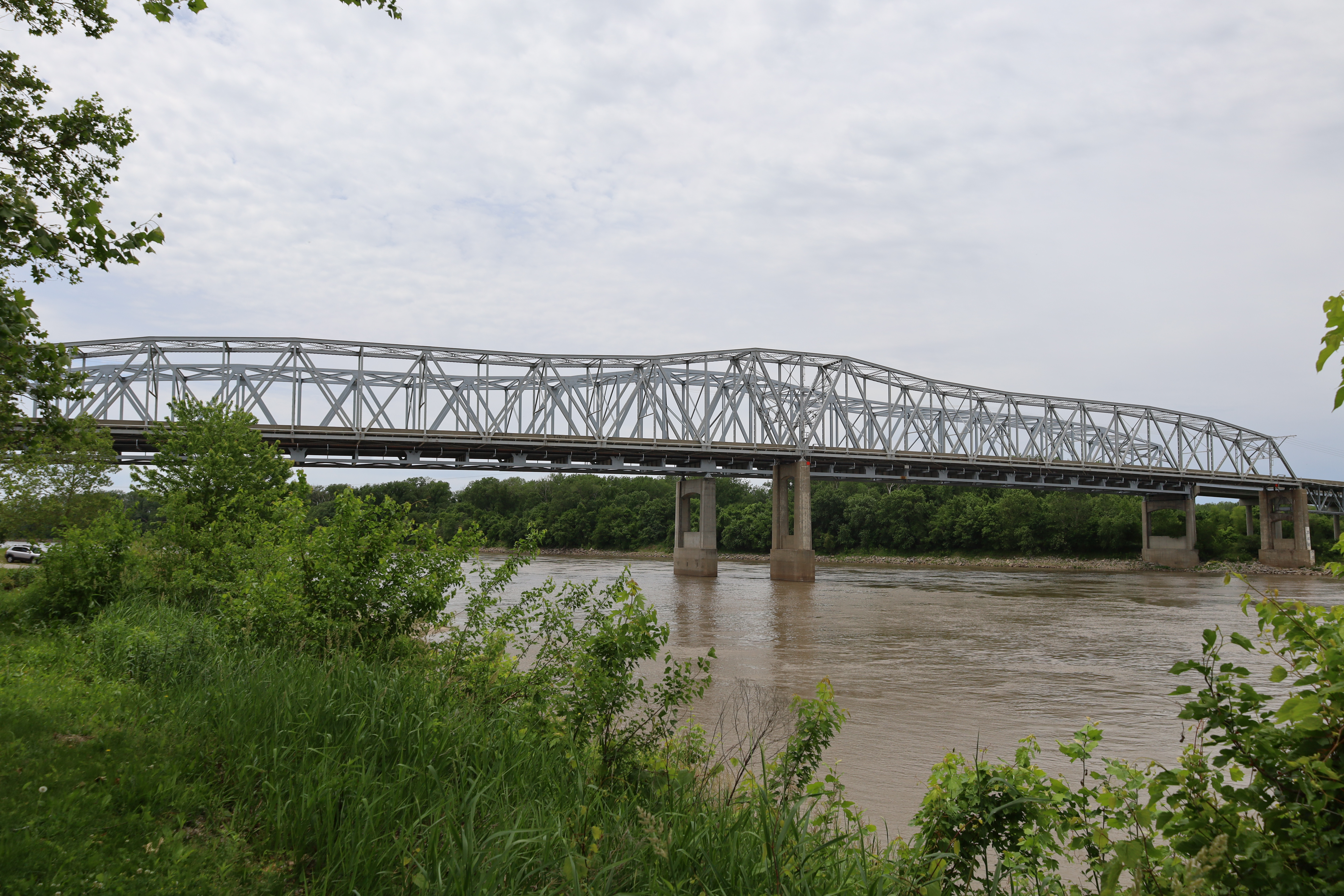
- The bridge in 2025
- Coordinates: 39°10′04″N 94°23′42″W
- Carries: Route 291
- Crosses: Missouri River
- Locale: Sugar Creek, Missouri

Characteristics
- Design: Continuous truss bridges
- Material: Steel
- Total length: 1,883.3 feet
- Longest span: 460.1 feet
- Clearance above: 16.5 feet

History
- Opened: 1949 (now northbound span); 2001 (now southbound span)

Location
- Interactive map of Liberty Bend Bridge

The Liberty Bend Bridge is a twin bridge that carries Missouri Route 291 over the Missouri River in Sugar Creek, Missouri in the Kansas City metropolitan area.

== Description ==
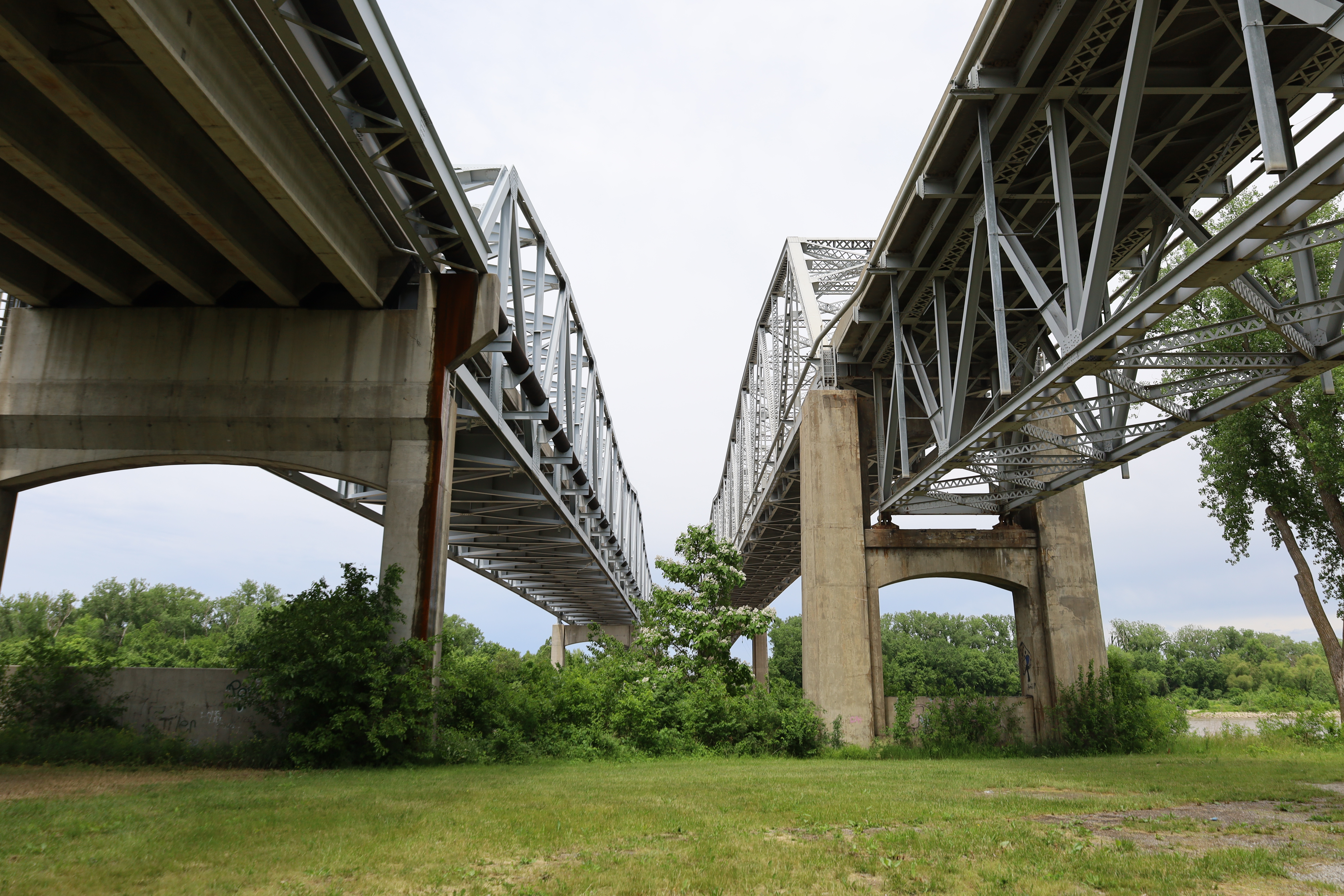
The two bridge spans in 2025

The bridge consists of two parallel continuous truss bridges. The main span length is 460.1 feet and the total length is 1,883.3 feet. Vertical clearance is 16.5 feet. The northbound deck has a width of 23.9 feet, and the southbound bridge has a width of 40 feet. The northbound bridge is taller than the southbound one, though the southbound bridge is wider and was made using contemporary construction techniques.

Although the bridges cross over the Missouri River, they do not cross the county line. When the Missouri River was rerouted in 1949, it cut across the northern part of Jackson County, Missouri. This left part of the county north of the river, which is known as River Bend.

== History ==
=== Original bridge ===
The original Liberty Bend Bridge was located about two miles to the north, which then crossed over into Clay County, Missouri. The first Liberty Bend Bridge was a cantilever truss bridge, built over the Missouri River. It opened to traffic in 1927, and carried traffic over the Missouri River and a pair of railroad tracks.

=== Replacement bridge ===
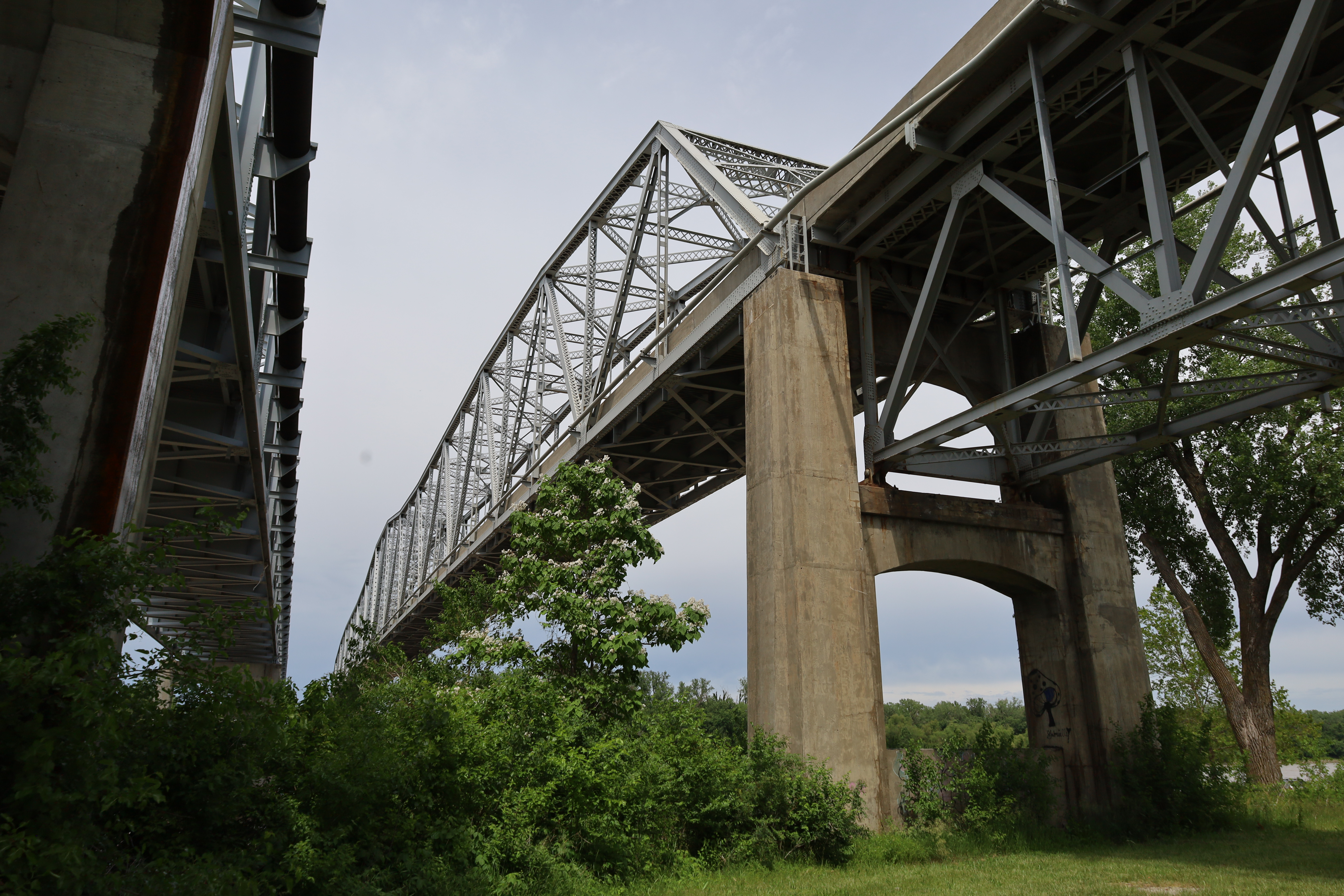
The 1949 span in 2025

In the late 1940s, plans were developed to relocate the Liberty Bend was about 2 miles (3.2 km) north of where it was previously located. Because of this, the part of Missouri Route 291 in the area was to be demolished, and a new bridge was to be built to replace it. The Mount Vernon Bridge Company was contracted to construct it. Removal of the roadway and construction on the new Liberty Bend began in 1947. The bridge was opened in early 1949.

In its first couple months of operation, the new bridge carried traffic over dry land; this was done to save money, as it would cost less to build the bridge before the Liberty Bend was completed. On April 16, 1949, the final blast of the project resulted in the poring of water underneath the bridge, at which point the water began rushing under the new bridge. When it was built, it was only 10 feet wide and 15 feet deep, though this was later widened by erosion, reducing the amount of labor involved.

In the late 1960s and early 1970s, Missouri Route 291 was rebuilt into a four-laned highway along the east side of the old highway, and a new pair of girder bridges were built to replace the narrow outmoded 1927 span. At that point, the span and its winding approaches were closed permanently; aside from the segment towards the bridge, it was entirely demolished by 1973. The old bridges electric lines were replaced with dedicated cables, and the approaches were truncated to not cross the river at all. the approach closer to the former bridge was renamed as Southview Drive, and traffic was blocked off form crossing.

In 1984, the bridge's deck replaced by a new steel grid deck. Additionally, in 1986, the raminig part of the deck was replaced.

=== Companion bridge ===
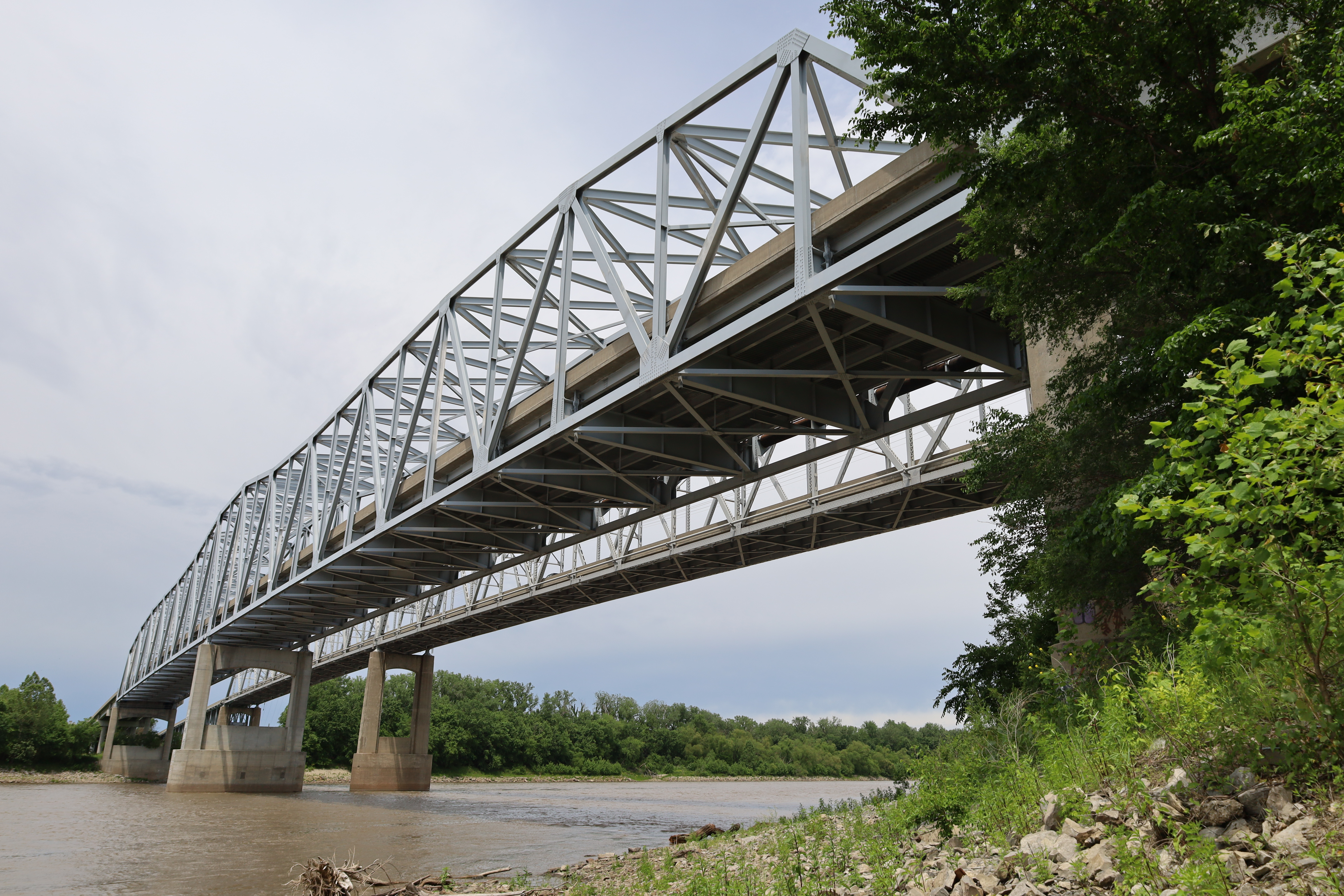
The 2001 span in 2025

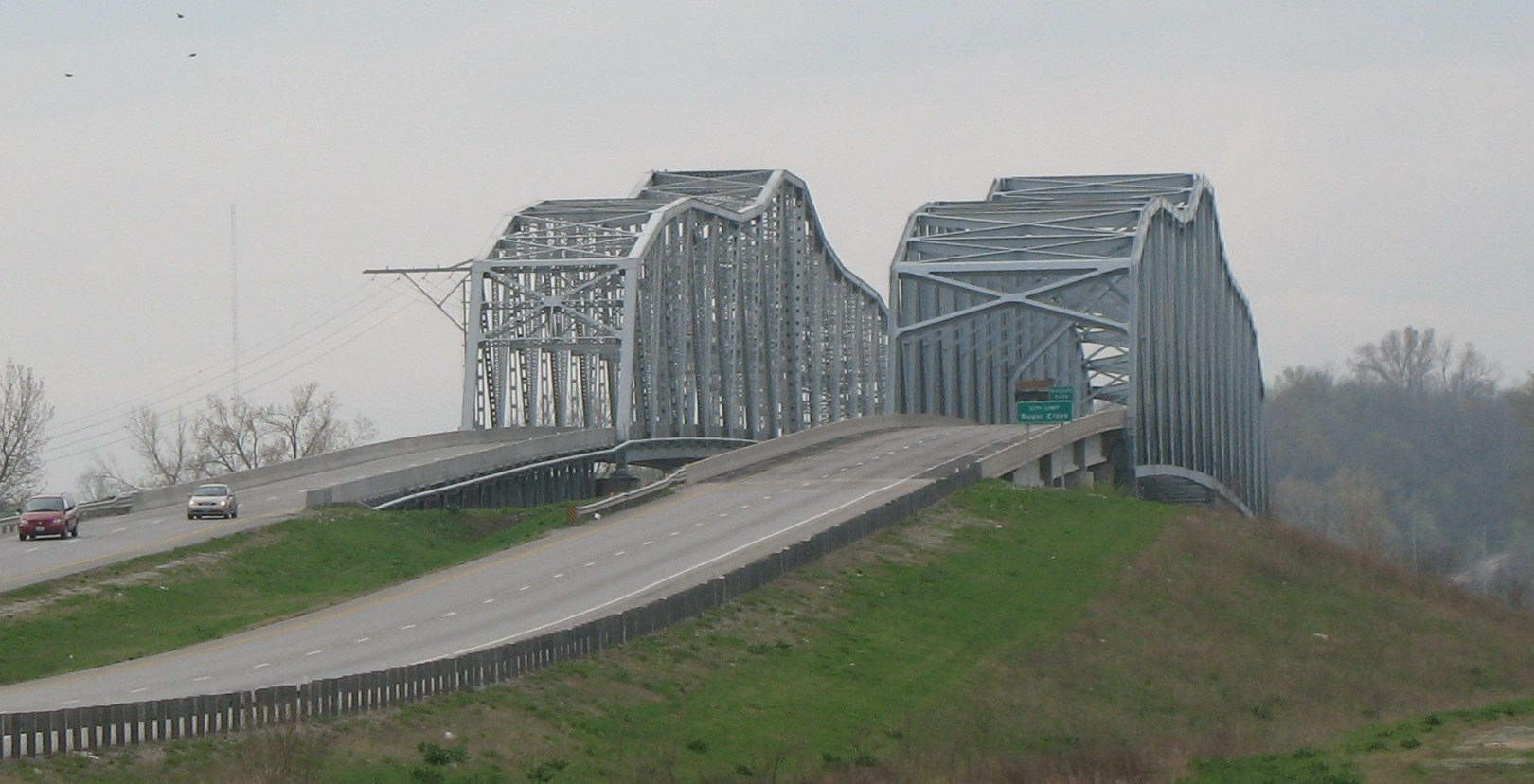
The bridge in 2007

In 1996, construction of a second bridge started. It was completed and opened to traffic in 2001. With the completion of the new bridge, all traffic was moved over to the new span. Work immediately began on rehabilitating the original bridge; its steel deck was replaced with concrete, structure repaired, among other minor upgrades. The bridge reopened to northbound traffic in 2005, at which point the new bridge was converted to carrying southbound traffic.

On July 7, 2009, a routine inspection revealed serious problems with the northbound bridge. MoDOT immediately closed the span indefinitely. In a few days a temporary (permanent/paved) crossover was constructed, allowing the rerouting of northbound traffic to share the southbound bridge while repairs were completed. The span opened for traffic in September 2009.

In 2015, the northbound bridge was again closed for repairs.

== Future ==
There are currently plans to replace the northbound span. It only has a sufficiency rating of 55.7 out of 100, and is considered functionally obsolete. However, due to its historical significance, this would also require that the northbound bridge be relocated by any group that wants it. It would not cost them any money, however they would be required to pay moving the bridge through their own money. The offer will only last until September 30, 2024. The replacement bridge is estimated to cost $87,500,000, and construction of the new span will not begin until at least 2027.

== See also ==
- List of crossings of the Missouri River
