= Fiji Commerce Commission =

Fijian fair trade regulatory body

The Fiji Commerce Commission is a statutory organisation responsible for fair trade, competition (economics) and consumer protection regulation in the Fiji Islands. It was initially established in 1998 under the Commerce Act 1998 [Fiji]. The commission is an independent statutory body that seeks to protect consumers and businesses from restrictive and unfair trade practices. When it was established, the Commission was principally responsible for enforcing Fiji's competition policies and laws. It was modelled on the Australian Competition & Consumer Commission. In 2010 the Fiji government passed the Commerce Commission Act 2010 which saw the Commission taken on extra responsibilities that notably included price control. Two of Fiji's regulatory agencies, the Department of Fair Trading & Consumer Affairs and the Prices & Incomes Board ceased to exist as separate entities following this new law. The functions, operations and staff of the two agencies are now merged into the Commerce Commission.

== Functions ==
The Commission is tasked with:

- the maintenance of a register of access agreements;
- the facilitation of negotiations about access to infrastructure facilities or services under access regimes
- the arbitration of disputes about access to infrastructure facilities or services under access regimes;
- the modification or revocation of licensing conditions in accordance with relevant laws relating to a regulated industry if referred to the Commission by the delegating authority under that law;
- the collection, examination and dissemination of information on matters affecting or likely to affect the interests of consumers and businesses;
- investigation of complaints regarding deceptive practices such as misuse of market power, collusion and price fixing, collective tendering and bid rigging, blatant and systematic disregard for fair trade practices and non-compliance.
- if sought, advise and assist consumers and businesses on matters affecting or likely to affect their interests whether in a negotiation or the acquisition of goods or services; and
- the review of commercial activities for the purposes of fixing and declaring maximum prices and where need be quantities for goods, services and rents.

The Commission works closely with the Consumer Council of Fiji particularly on matters affecting consumers rights.

== History ==
With the introduction of the Commerce Commission Act in 1998, the Fiji government established a four-member Commerce Commission in October of the same year. The Commission was dissolved by the Fiji Labour Party government in 1999. Following the 2000 Fijian coup d'état, a new Commission was appointed in October 2000 by the then interim government. In March 2004 the Commission set up its main office at the Garden City Complex in Suva expanding in 2010 to Lautoka, and Labasa. The Commission Secretariat is headed by the Chief Executive Officer, currently Mr Joel Abraham, who holds a Double Masters (Professional Accounting, International Relations & Diplomacy), he also holds a Post graduate Diploma in Climate Change. The current commissioners include: the Chairman, Joann Young, a consultant with the UN; Deputy Chair Firoz Ghazali; lawyer Lyanne Vaurasi, Vimlesh Sagar - chief financial officer FBC, entrepreneur Romil Patel - founder and director of Jewels Fiji, and Isikeli Tikoduadua - a telecommunications director and former CEO of Home Finance Bank .
