= Feline cutaneous asthenia =

Disease affecting cats

Feline cutaneous asthenia is a rare inheritable skin disease of cats characterised by abnormal elasticity, stretching, and improper healing of the skin. Pendulous wing-like folds of skin form on the cat's back, shoulders and haunches. Even stroking the cat can cause the skin to stretch and tear. A recessive autosomal (non-sex linked) form of feline cutaneous asthenia has been identified in Siamese cats and related breeds. In the homozygous state, it is apparently lethal. Feline cutaneous asthenia is similar to the Ehlers–Danlos syndrome of humans.

Cats with cutaneous asthenia cannot be grasped by the scruff, as this may tear away. Cats may also have slipping joints, as in human Ehlers-Danlos syndrome. Dietary supplements may be needed to promote skin healing and regrowth.

== Cause ==
There are two genetic traits linked to feline cutaneous asthenia. One comes from a dominant allele, while the other comes from a recessive. Both result in similar pathology.

Cats with the autosomal dominant form of feline cutaneous asthenia package type I collagen poorly. Collagen is a major component in skin tissue and in tendons. While scientists originally suspected that the problem lay in the production of the type I collagen molecule, it is now known that type V collagen is the molecule which is incorrectly produced. Although scientists do not know exactly how, many suspect that type V collagen assists in packaging type I collagen. Collagen fibrils are often abnormally sized and have unusually large amounts of space between them. The dermis is thinned because of this. In heterozygous cats, normal and abnormal fibrils often exist inside of the same collagen fiber. Homozygous cats are not likely to survive for very long.

The autosomal recessive form of feline cutaneous asthenia results in a deficiency of procollagen peptidase or a structural abnormality at its cleavage site. Procollagen peptidase is an enzyme necessary for the post-translational modification of procollagen into collagen. Because of the abnormalities in the formation of collagen fibrils, affected cats produce twisted collagen ribbons, rather than the normal collagen cylinders one would expect to find.

== Symptoms ==
In the case of the autosomal dominant form of the disease, kittens are often born with abnormally soft and velvety skin. Normal scratching and playing with other cats will begin to cause tears in the skin, usually starting at around eight weeks of age. Injuries often heal rapidly, leaving scars. Rarely, joint overmobility can result from the disease.

Autosomal recessive cats can develop extreme skin hyperextensibility, but do not suffer from joint hypermobility.

== Treatment ==
Although feline cutaneous asthenia is not curable, there are treatment and management options for the disease. Affected animals must be kept away from others, and sharp corners on tables and other furniture must be padded. Cats should have their claws regularly trimmed so that they cannot injure themselves while scratching, and it is often advised that males be neutered, both because of the heritability of the disease and because there is a chance of injury during mating. If something causes the skin to tear, it should be sutured if possible, and the wound should be treated with antibiotics as needed. Vitamin C is also given to cats in controlled doses, to assist with the translation of collagen. Given proper care, cats with feline cutaneous asthenia can live long lives, although the prognosis is not as positive if joint hypermobility is present.

== History ==
- In 1974, a four-year-old tomcat with fragile skin was taken to Cornell University's New York State Veterinary College Small Animal Clinic for investigation. Dr DV Scott noted that its skin was exceptionally thin and velvety in texture. It was hyperextensible (extremely stretchy) and had a criss-cross network of fine white scars from previously healed tears. When fur was clipped from a foreleg to gain a blood sample, the skin peeled away. Peeling was found to occur whenever the slightest pressure was applied anywhere to the cat's skin. Investigation showed that the collagen fibres in the cat's skin were abnormal.
- In 1975, an adult female cat examined by W.F. Butler of Bristol University's Anatomy Department was found to have very fragile skin on its body. It had abnormally low levels of collagen in the skin of its lower back.
- In 1977, Drs. Donald F. Patterson and Ronald R. Minor of the university of Pennsylvania's School of Veterinary Medicine studied a young short-haired gray tomcat which had severely lacerated its skin through normal scratching. Its skin was found to be delicate and easily torn. It was also abnormally elastic, and the skin of the back could be extended to a distance above the backbone equal to about 22% of the cat's entire body length. They wrote a paper on the subject and included photos of the cat with its skin gently stretched into "wings". Because of the difficulties in caring for a cat with an incurable skin fragility problem, they donated it to the veterinary school. It was mated to four long-haired female cats, and several of the offspring inherited cutaneous asthenia.
