= Consumer Federation of America =

US non-profit organization

- Abbreviation: CFA
- Founded: 1968; 58 years ago
- Type: 501(c)(3)
- Tax ID no.: 52-0880625
- Legal status: nonprofit organization
- Purpose: Research, advocacy, education, and service
- President: Marceline White
- CEO: Susan Weinstock
- Revenue: $2,924,063 (2018)
- Expenses: $3,646,969 (2018)
- Employees: 26 (2018)
- Volunteers: 1 (2018)
- Website: consumerfed.org

The Consumer Federation of America (CFA) is a non-profit organization founded in 1968 to advance consumer interests through research, education and advocacy.

The CFA's website states that its members are nearly 300 consumer-oriented non-profits, with a combined membership of 50 million people. CFA members include national organizations such as Consumers Union and U.S. PIRG, state and local consumer organizations, state and local protection agencies, credit unions, rural electric cooperatives and public power groups. Members pay dues ranging from under $100 to $20,000 per year, elect the board of directors and vote on policies.

The CFA undertakes a wide range of activities and interests; many activities centre on scrutinizing businesses and their practices, products, and services by citizens, civic groups, the news media, and government regulatory agencies to defend the interests of the public at large. It is generally regarded as liberal in the modern American sense of the term and is associated with the consumer movement. The organization is headquartered in Washington, DC, with numerous state and local members. CFA is a 501(c)(3) organization.

State consumer federations such as the Consumer Federation of California, Alabama Arise, Chicago Consumer Coalition, Wisconsin Consumers League, and the North Carolina Consumers Council also exist. These competitor federations advocate for similar rules and regulations but with a narrower geographic focus. All CFA member groups retain their autonomy. At the same time, their bylaws reflect a tendency to be united in purpose to impact public policy more significantly.

== Origins ==
CFA emerged from a national consumer forum, called Consumer Assembly that was first held in April 1966 to advance new consumer protections. Encouraged by White House Consumer Adviser Esther Peterson, representatives from nearly 60 consumer groups, consumer cooperative groups, and industrial trade unions decided to form a permanent organization that was formally launched in April 1968.

CFA made Consumer Assembly its annual conference and held this forum in conjunction with the organization’s annual meeting. At this meeting, member organizations elected a 40 to 43-person board of directors and debated and voted on policy resolutions for the organization.

== Leadership ==
Erma Angevine was selected as the organization’s first Executive Director. She served until 1973, and was followed by Carol Tucker Foreman (1973-1977), Kathleen O’Reilly (1977-1980), Stephen Brobeck (1980-2018), and Jack Gillis (2018-2022). Currently, Susan Weinstock is the CEO of CFA (2022–present). Retired Senator Howard Metzenbaum served as Honorary Chairman from 1995 to 2008.

== Funding ==
Historically, CFA’s base of support has been member dues' payments, contributions, and grants. For decades, Consumers Union has contributed, through contributions and grants, more than $100,000 a year.

Over the past decade, the largest source of support has been grants by national foundations including Ford, Annie E. Casey, Rockefeller, Atlantic Philanthropies, and Heron. Other revenue is derived from cy-près awards, Consumer Assembly, the annual Awards dinner, and financial services and food policy issue conferences, to which some corporate groups contribute. America Saves (see below), which CFA organized and manages, was supported initially by the Ford Foundation, but now mainly is supported by corporate foundations.

== Advocacy ==
Advocacy is one of the important tools that CFA uses to advance the consumer interest. “CFA works to advance pro-consumer policies on a variety of issues before Congress, the White House, federal and state regulatory agencies, state legislatures, and the courts. We communicate and work with public officials to promote beneficial policies, oppose harmful ones, and ensure a balanced debate on issues important to consumers.” CFA advocates on numerous issues that are important to the consumer community. In recent years, these issues have included:

- Advocating for a Consumer Financial Protection Agency.
- Advocating for consumer protections for credit cards, including passage of the Credit Card Accountability, Responsibility, and Disclosure (CARD) Act.
- Advocating for the implementation of higher fuel efficiency (CAFE) standards.
- Advocating for consumer protections for investors, including passage of the Sarbanes Oxley law.
- Advocating for more authority and responsibility for the Food and Drug Administration to ensure the safety of the food supply.
- Advocating for product safety laws, including passage of the Consumer Product Safety Improvement Act and ATV regulation.

== State and local consumer member groups ==
- Consumer Federation of California
- Maryland Public Interest Research Group
- New York Public Interest Research Group
- Massachusetts Public Interest Research Group
- National Consumer Law Center
- Center for Economic Progress, Chicago
- Illinois Public Interest Research Group
- Public Interest Research Group in Michigan
- Minnesota Public Interest Research Group
- Ohio Public Interest Research Group
