= Missouri Public Interest Research Group =

Organization

Missouri Public Interest Research Group (MoPIRG) is a non-profit organization that is part of the state PIRG organizations.

MoPIRG began in March, 1971, after students at Saint Louis University heard a speech by Ralph Nader. Nader inspired the students to organize citizen action groups modeled after similar groups in Oregon and Minnesota. The Center for Student Action at Saint Louis University and the Missouri Public Action Council at Washington University in St. Louis lobbied to establish a public interest research organization funded by a small assessment added to student activities fees. Student referendums on both campuses supported the fee assessment. The two student groups combined their operations and formed MoPIRG.

== History ==
The PIRGs emerged in the early 1970s on U.S. college campuses. The PIRG model was proposed in the book Action for a Change by Ralph Nader and Donald Ross. Among other early accomplishments, the PIRGs were responsible for much of the Container Deposit Legislation in the United States, also known as "bottle bills."

MoPIRG began in March, 1971, after students at Saint Louis University heard a speech by Ralph Nader. Nader inspired the students to organize citizen action groups modeled after similar groups in Oregon and Minnesota. The Center for Student Action at Saint Louis University and the Missouri Public Action Council at Washington University in St. Louis lobbied to establish a public interest research organization funded by a small assessment added to student activities fees. Student referendums on both campuses supported the fee assessment. The two student groups combined their operations and formed MoPIRG.

MoPIRG's earliest campaigns included a successful appeal to the Federal Trade Commission to investigate deceptive advertising and sales practices by some St. Louis used car dealers in 1972. The group was also represented on the St. Louis Advertising Review Board, a self-regulatory board of the Advertising Club and the Better Business Bureau. MoPIRG gained national attention for its criticism of self-regulation by the advertising industry. MoPIRG also championed the right to representation for St. Louis City Jail prisoners. Their proposal led to the establishment of an ombudsman position by the St. Louis Department of Welfare in August, 1973.

MOPIRG was active in campaigns to stop legislation that would raise the legal ceiling of small loan interest rates in Missouri, drafted a consumer protection ordinance presented to the St. Louis Board of Aldermen in September, 1973, and published research on a variety of consumer and citizen related issues. It researched and developed legislation that helped improve workers' compensation laws in Missouri and was also successful in stopping an effort to eliminate the public display rating system for area restaurants. From 1975 to 1981, MOPIRG developed a comprehensive revision of the state landlord-tenant law and successfully worked for its passage twice in the Missouri House of Representatives, although the bill was defeated both times in the Senate.

In 1977, President Jimmy Carter attempted to reform the patronage system of judicial selection for the Circuit Court of Appeals. MoPIRG responded by forming a coalition of eleven political organizations, including the League of Women Voters and the NAACP, to urge Senator Thomas Eagleton to establish a merit nominating process on the state level. Senator Eagleton's resistance to this idea led MoPIRG to work successfully for legislation requiring the President to develop merit selection guidelines.

Other issues MoPIRG has been involved with include requiring school testing services to make test results available to students, curbing utility rate increases, reforming media practices, and passing a national advisory referendum that would allow a non-binding public vote on government policy questions.

== Affiliate organizations ==
- The Fund for Public Interest Research
- Environment America
