= Colston Warne =

American economist

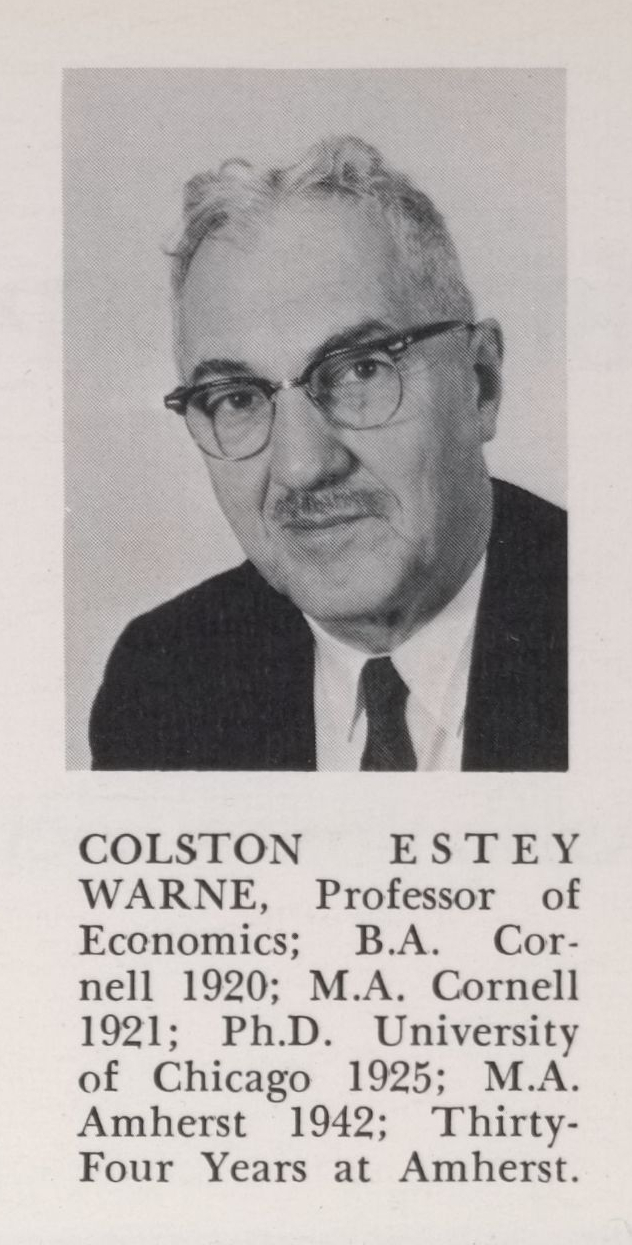
Warne in the Amherst College yearbook, 1964

Colston Estey Warne (August 14, 1900 – May 20, 1987) was an American professor of economics and one of the founders of Consumers Union (along with Arthur Kallet), in 1936. He served as president of the board of directors from 1936 to 1979. He also served as President of the International Organization of Consumers Unions (IOCU) from 1960 to 1970, which later became Consumers International under Rhoda Karpatkin. He was the father of Barbara Newell.

== Early life ==
Warne was born in 1900 in the Finger Lakes region of New York. His father managed a country store, farmed, and participated in the local Presbyterian church. Warne attended nearby Cornell University where in 1921 he graduated with a master's degrees in economics. While there he met his future wife, Frances Lee Corbett, who was studying home economics. He also began studying the writings of Thorstein Veblen. In 1925 Warne earned a doctorate in political economy from the University of Chicago. He taught at the University of Pittsburgh and later became professor of economics at Amherst College from 1930 until his retirement in 1969.

At Amherst, his courses on labor history were highly popular during the 1930s. After World War II, he participated in the required sophomore American Studies course, where he edited several of the "Problems in American Civilization" anthologies produced in that course and widely imitated. After his retirement, under President John William Ward, Amherst awarded him an honorary doctorate.

== Un-American Activities ==
He testified before the House Un-American Activities Committee, when it investigated charges of Communism in the consumer movement. Speaking in 1954 to have Consumers Union removed from the list of subversive organizations, Warne said, "I am an upstate New York Yankee... I am not a Communist."

== Recognition ==
He is an Ordo Honoris brother of the Kappa Delta Rho fraternity, having initiated into the Beta chapter at Cornell University.

== Death ==
Warne died May 20, 1987, in Bedford, Massachusetts.

== Sources ==
- Colston E. Warne papers, 1910-1995, David M. Rubenstein Rare Book & Manuscript Library, Duke University, Durham, North Carolina.
- Colston Warne, Amherst College Oral History Project, Interviewed on November 8, 1978
- Hudson, Edward (May 21, 1987). "C.E. Warne dies; consumer leader". The New York Times. New York. ISSN 0362-4331.
- Brobeck, Stephen (1997). "Warne, Colston E.". In Brobeck, Stephen (ed.). Encyclopedia of the Consumer Movement. Santa Barbara, Calif.: ABC-Clio. pp. 619–620. ISBN 0874369878.
- Brobeck, Stephen (1990). The modern consumer movement : references and resources (1. publ. ed.). Boston, Mass.: G.K. Hall. ISBN 0816118337.
- Warne, Colston E. (1993). The consumer movement : lectures. Manhattan, Kan.: Family Economics Trust Press. ISBN 1881331016.
- Folkart, Burt A. (May 22, 1987). "Founder of the Consumers Union Dies - Los Angeles Times". Los Angeles Times.
