= Environment California =

Environmental lobby group

- Founded: 1970s
- Location: Los Angeles, California, U.S.
- Fields: Environmentalism
- Website: www.environmentcalifornia.org

Environment California is a nonprofit political organization that lobbies for environmental legislation in the U.S. state of California. It is affiliated with Environment America and the Fund for the Public Interest ("the Fund").

== History ==
Environment California was formed by the California Public Interest Research Group (CALPIRG) in 2003 to take over its environmental work.

In 2024, Environment California sued the City of Los Angeles for alleged violations of the federal Clean Water Act, claiming the Port of Los Angeles had violated the act more that 2,000 times in the previous 5 years by discharging storm water contaminated with fecal bacteria and groundwater contaminated with copper into San Pedro Bay.

In April 2025, Environment California settled the lawsuit with the Port of Los Angeles. Under the settlement, the Port is required to pay $1.3 million to the Rose Foundation For Communities & The Environment for projects to restore the Los Angeles Harbor and San Pedro Bay. The Port will also pay a $130,000 civil penalty to the U.S. Treasury. It also requires the Port to treat the storm water and send the groundwater to Terminal Island Water Reclamation Plant.

== Structure and canvassing efforts ==
In the book Activism, Inc., Dana Fisher, a sociologist, says that Environment California's fundraising model mistreats idealistic young people by using them as interchangeable parts and providing them with insufficient training. Fisher published this opinion after completing a 2003 study of random canvass offices throughout the entire United States.

== See also ==
- California Environmental Protection Agency
