= Ohio Public Interest Research Group =

Organization

Ohio Public Interest Research Group (Ohio PIRG) is a non-profit organization that is part of the state PIRG organizations. It works on a variety of political activities.

In the United States, Public Interest Research Groups (PIRGs) are non-profit organizations that employ grassroots organizing, direct advocacy, investigative journalism, and litigation to affect public policy.

== Mission ==
Ohio PIRG's mission is to support activism that protects the environment, encourages sustainable economy, and fosters a democratic government.

== History ==
The PIRGs emerged in the early 1970s on U.S. college campuses. The PIRG model was proposed in the book Action for a Change by Ralph Nader and Donald Ross. Among other early accomplishments, the PIRGs were responsible for much of the Container Container Deposit Legislation in the United States, also known as "bottle bill".

== Notable members and alumni ==
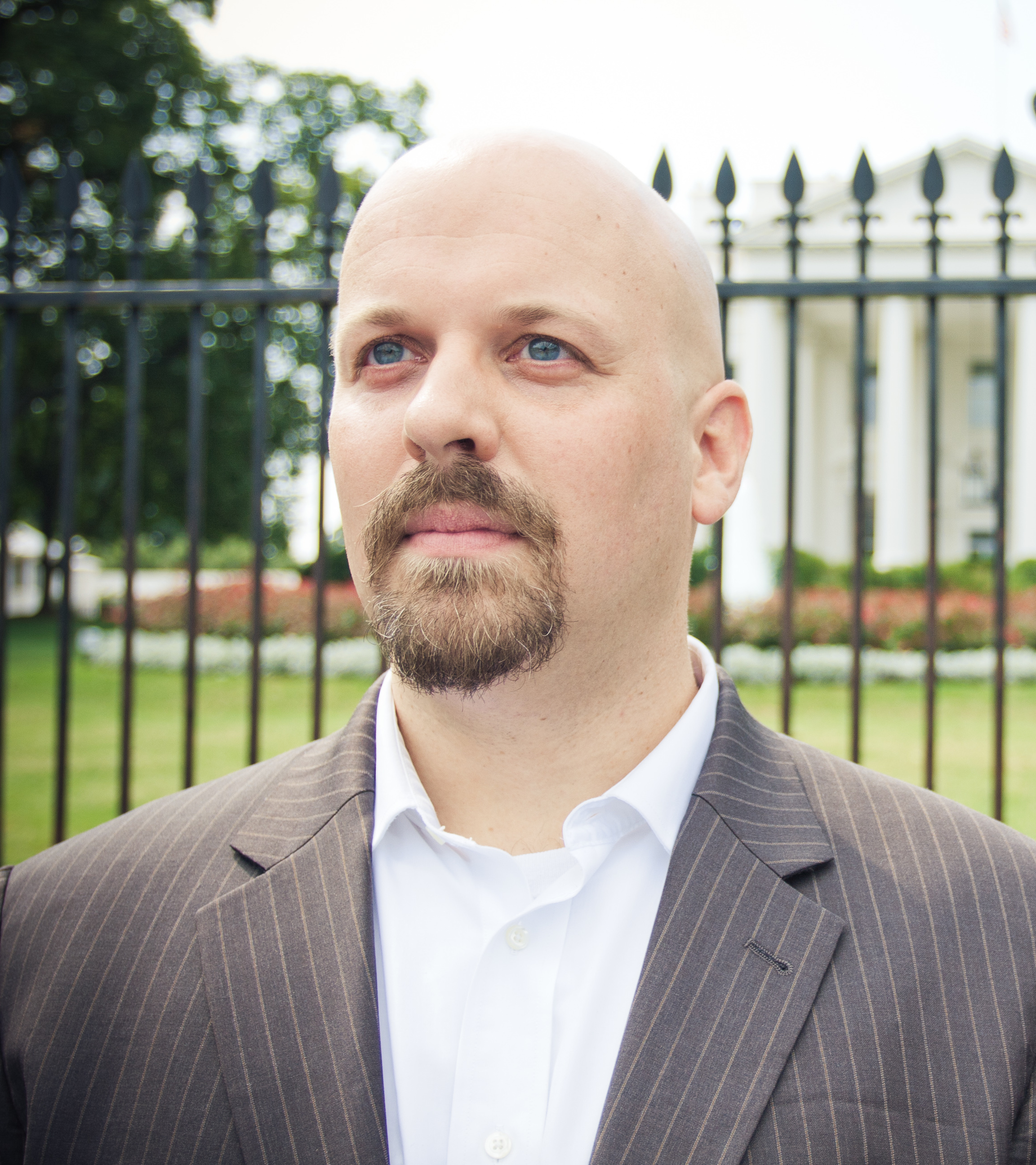
Phil Radford, environmental leader

- Phil Radford

== Affiliate organizations ==
- The Fund for Public Interest Research
- Environment Ohio
- Environment America
