= Public Interest Research Group in Michigan =

Non-profit organization

Public Interest Research Group in Michigan (PIRGIM) is a non-profit organization that is part of the state PIRG organizations.

PIRGIM has a history of working on a variety of issues, such as cleaning Michigan's waterways, toy safety, and chemical safety.

== History ==
The PIRGs emerged in the early 1970s on U.S. college campuses. The PIRG model was proposed in the book Action for a Change by Ralph Nader and Donald Ross. Among other early accomplishments, the PIRGs were responsible for much of the Container Container Deposit Legislation in the United States, also known as "bottle bills."

== Notable members and alumni ==
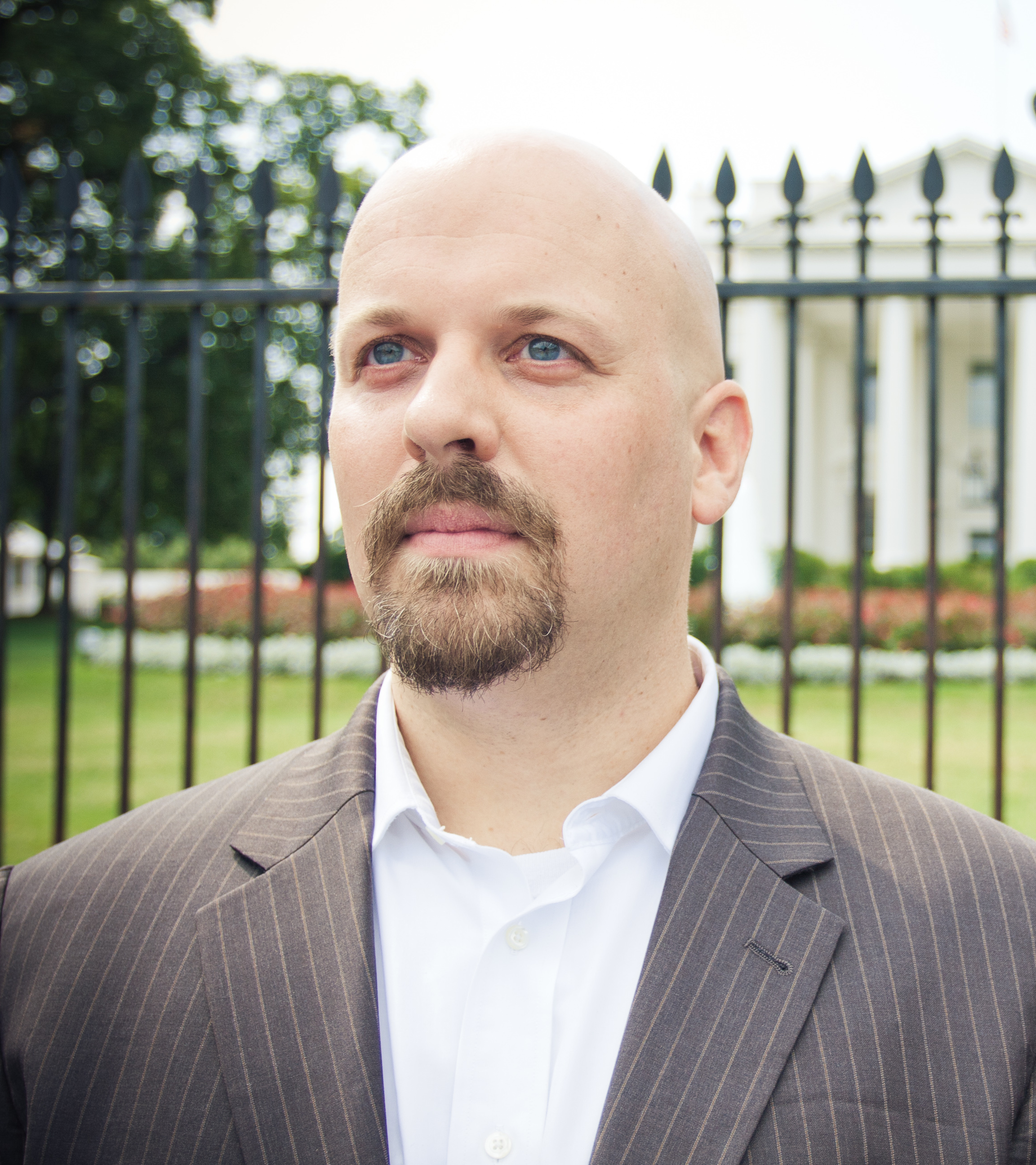
Phil Radford, environmental leader

- Phil Radford

== Affiliate organizations ==
- The Fund for Public Interest Research
- Environment Michigan
