= Environment Oregon =

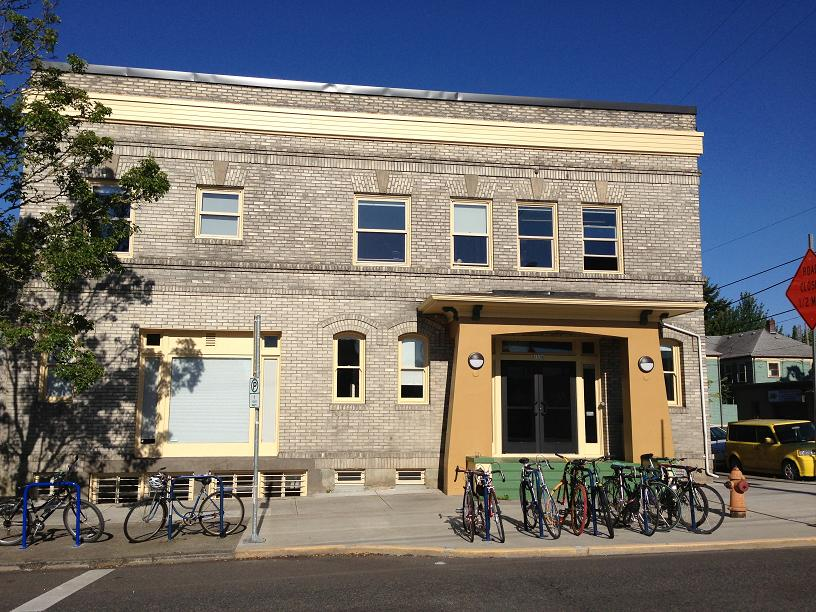
Environment Oregon headquarters in Portland

Environment Oregon is a political non-profit organization in the U.S. state of Oregon, that lobbies for legislation in regard to environmental policy on local, state and national levels. It is affiliated with Environment America, a federation of environmental organizations in thirty states. Based in Portland, Oregon, it has more than 35,000 members throughout the state. It is also partnered with the Environment Oregon Research & Policy Center, its sister 501(c)(3) organization.

== History ==
Environment Oregon was created in 2007 to house the Oregon State Public Interest Research Group (OSPIRG, a local affiliate of the Public Interest Research Group) environmental programs. OSPIRG was started by students at the University of Oregon, inspired by Ralph Nader, who did a speaking tour of college campuses in the early 1970s.

== Campaigns ==
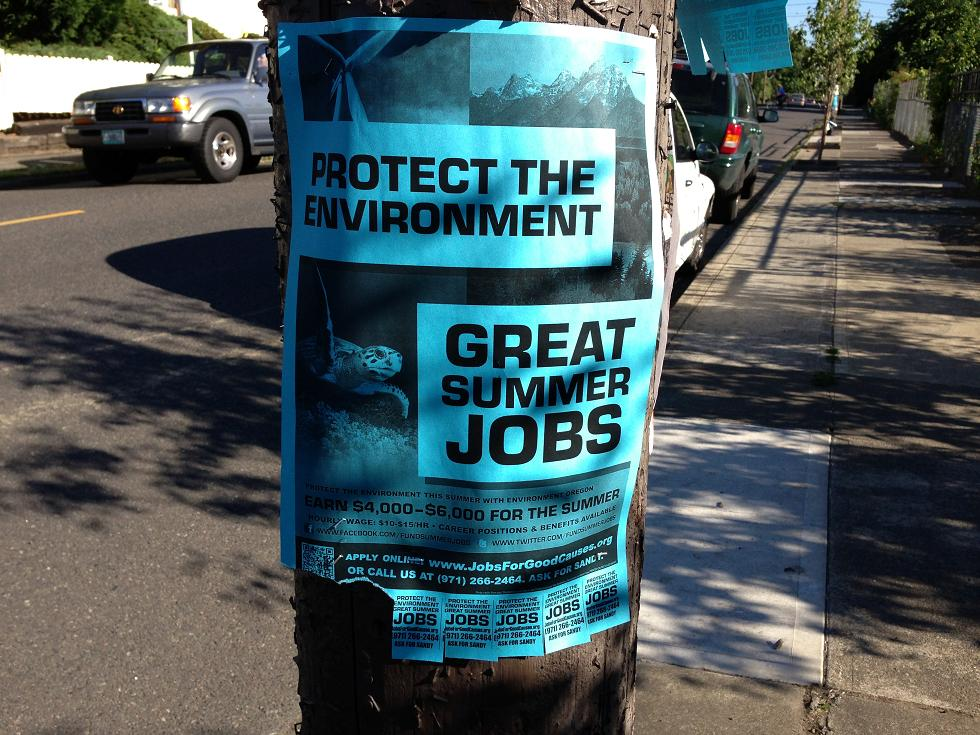
An Environment Oregon job poster in Portland

As of 2014, Environment Oregon was working on a campaign to stop the Bybee timber sale outside of Crater Lake National Park. Critical wildlife habitat surrounding Crater Lake is under threat from bulldozers, backhoes and chainsaws. Around the park, logging companies are pushing to clearcut thousands of acres of forest—land that shelters the headwaters of the Rogue and Umpqua rivers, which are critical for maintaining healthy runs of Steelhead, Coho and Chinook salmon. In response to these threats, Environment Oregon is calling on Congress to create a new fully protected wilderness area that spans over 500,000 acres of wilderness and creates a 75-mile wildlife corridor. After discussing the campaign face-to-face with over 60,000 Oregonians, in 2013, the organization delivered over 10,000 public comments to the United States Forest Service to support stopping the sale.

In 2012, Environment Oregon launched a campaign to encourage development of 250,000 solar roofs in Oregon by 2025. In July 2012, the group released a new report, "Solar Works for Oregon," which outlines the sun's vast potential to provide power, protect the environment, and create jobs for Oregonians. The report revealed that Oregon could feasibly develop enough electricity from rooftop solar in the next decade to power 250,000 typical Oregon homes—or all the homes in Portland. Oregon could also produce 30 times as much solar energy as it does today— preventing 3.8 million tons of carbon dioxide pollution, the equivalent of taking 730,000 cars off the road.

Environment Oregon has also worked to promote awareness of and measures to address Oregon's connection to the Great Pacific Garbage Patch. In 2012, they successfully helped promote legislation to ban plastic bags in Portland, Corvallis and Eugene.

In 2007 Environment Oregon campaigned for renewable energy and for Measure 49, a ballot measure regarding land use planning.

== Membership ==
Environment Oregon works with the Fund for the Public Interest to conduct its fundraising and membership development campaigns, employing dozens of canvassers and callers who contact Oregonians door-to-door, on street corners and over the phone. Facing criticism for its recruitment and employment practices, in 2009 the fund was a defendant in a lawsuit brought by current and former canvassers.
