= Illinois Public Interest Research Group =

Organization

Illinois PIRG
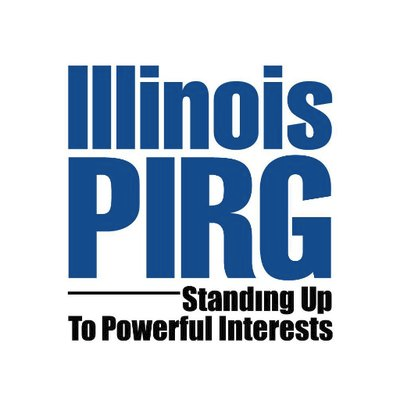
- Formation: 1987; 39 years ago
- Type: Advocacy organization
- Location: Illinois, United States
- Key people: Abe Scarr (Director)
- Website: illinoispirg.org

Illinois Public Interest Research Group (Illinois PIRG) is a non-profit organization that is part of the state PIRG organizations. It works on a variety of political activities, including childhood obesity, reducing the interest on student loans, and closing tax loopholes.

In the United States, Public Interest Research Groups (PIRGs) are non-profit organizations that employ grassroots organizing, direct advocacy, investigative journalism, and litigation to affect public policy.

== History ==
Illinois PIRG was founded in 1987, and has offices in Chicago, Springfield, IL, and a national lobbying office in Washington, D.C. called US PIRG.

The PIRGs emerged in the early 1970s on U.S. college campuses. The PIRG model was proposed in the book Action for a Change by Ralph Nader and Donald Ross. Among other early accomplishments, the PIRGs were responsible for much of the Container Container Deposit Legislation in the United States, also known as "bottle bills."

== Notable members and alumni ==
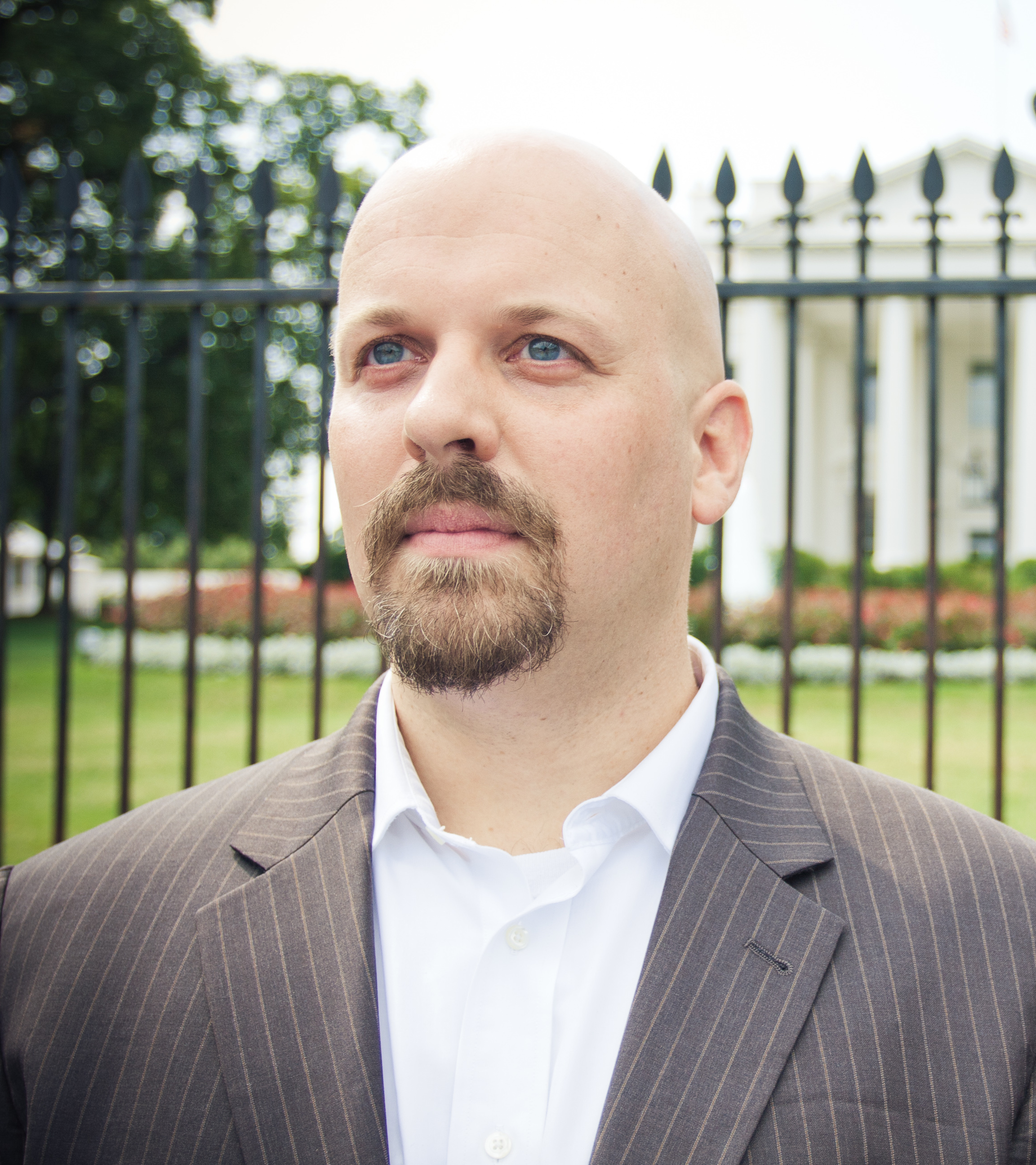
Phil Radford, environmental leader

- Phil Radford

== Affiliate organizations ==
- The Fund for Public Interest Research
- Environment Illinois
