= Massachusetts Public Interest Research Group =

Organization

Massachusetts Public Interest Research Group (MASSPIRG) is a non-profit organization that is one of the largest of the state PIRG organizations. It works on a variety of political activities, including textbook trading on college campuses. They also provide internships and work study jobs for students on Massachusetts college campuses. Along with the Massachusetts Service Alliance, MASSPIRG helped to create Massachusetts Community Water Watch, an organization that works specifically on environmental politics. Student funding of MASSPIRG has been criticized at several schools where students wish to see MASSPIRG funding cut, citing that the mandatory fees do not effectively contribute directly to any cause on campus, and are a complication to students forced to pay "already tedious" tuition fees.

== History ==
The Public Interest Research Groups emerged at the behest of Ralph Nader who, during a college speaking tour, called on students to form political groups.

== Criticism and rebuttal ==
The book Activism, Inc: How the Outsourcing of Grassroots Campaigns Is Strangling Progressive Politics in America by Columbia University sociologist Dana Fisher, is based on an ethnographic study she did in a stratified random sample of fund canvass offices during the summer of 2003. Fisher charges the corporatized fundraising model (of which the Fund is an example) with mistreating idealistic young people by using them as interchangeable parts and providing them with insufficient training. Fisher also states that the outsourcing of grassroots organizing by groups like the Sierra Club and Greenpeace to organizations like the Fund has led to the decay of grassroots infrastructure and opportunities for involvement on the left. The Fund has created a website, canvassingworks.org, to respond to a few of the criticisms raised by the book. The site includes testimony by former Fund staff who have moved into leading roles in other progressive organizations and other progressive leaders, including U.S. Representative Jan Schakowsky (IL), Sierra Club Executive Director Carl Pope, Dr. Woody Holton (Associate Professor of American history at the University of Richmond), and Randy Hayes of the Rainforest Action Network.

== Notable members ==
- Joyce Elaine Roop

== Affiliate organizations ==
- The Fund for Public Interest Research
- Environment Massachusetts
- Human Rights Campaign
- Sierra Club
