= Illiana Expressway =

Controversial proposed toll road in the USA

Illiana Corridor
- Proposed Illiana Expressway corridor highlighted in red

Route information
- Length: 50 mi (80 km)
- History: Project Suspended

Major junctions
- West end: I-55 in Wilmington
- I-57 in Peotone
- East end: I-65 in Lowell

Location
- Country: United States
- States: Illinois, Indiana

Highway system
- Illinois State Highway System; Interstate; US; State; Tollways; Scenic
- Indiana State Highway System; Interstate; US; State; Scenic

The Illiana Expressway, also known as the Illiana Corridor, was a controversial proposed tolled freeway in northeastern Illinois and northwestern Indiana. Formal environmental impact statement studies were begun in April 2011 and were led jointly by the Illinois Department of Transportation (IDOT) and Indiana Department of Transportation (INDOT). It was planned as being approximately 50 miles (80 km) in length, mostly in Illinois, connecting Interstate 55 (I-55) in Illinois to I-65 in Indiana. The freeway was scheduled to open in 2018. However, construction plans were shelved in 2015 when Illinois Governor Bruce Rauner issued an executive order delaying the construction of new highways in the state.

== Route description ==
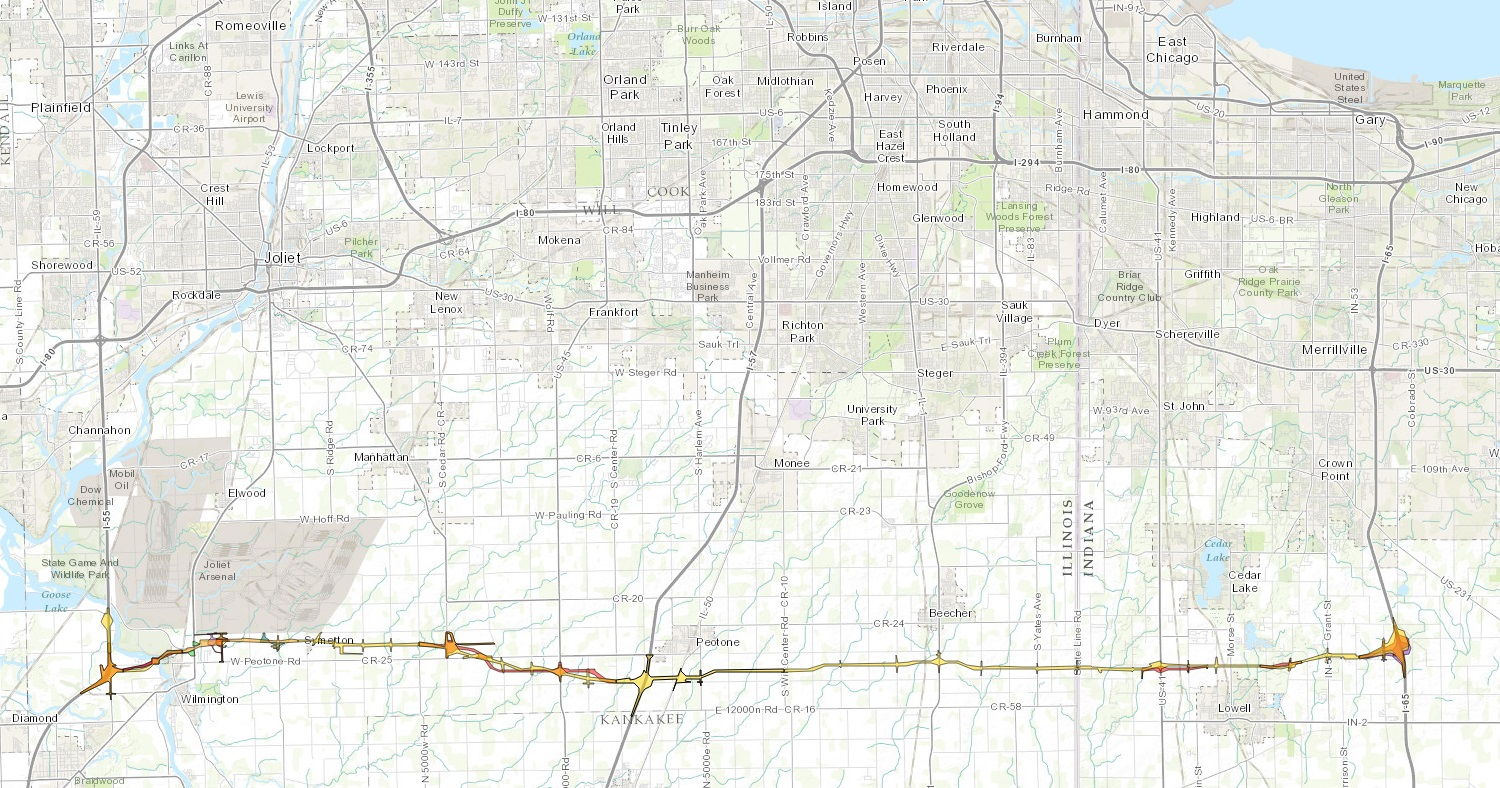
Tier Two Alternatives for the Illiana Expressway

The proposed route of the Illiana Expressway would have placed it between Interstate 55 in Illinois and Interstate 65 in Indiana, passing just south of the Joliet Army Ammunition Plant.

== History ==
=== Origins ===
The vision of the Illiana Corridor dates back to the 1909 Plan of Chicago by Daniel Burnham and Edward Bennett that included an "Outer Encircling Highway" serving northeastern Illinois and northwest Indiana. Conceptual highway corridors linking Illinois and Indiana south of Interstate 80 were also studied by regional planning agencies in both states in the 1960s and 1970s. More recently, feasibility studies for a potential Illiana expressway were completed in 2009 by Indiana and a supplemental study in 2010 by Illinois. These showed that transportation improvements could be possible, and set the stage for formal studies.

Following completion of these studies, a memorandum of understanding was signed on June 9, 2010, by the Governors of Illinois and Indiana, which formalized the partnership between the two states for planning a potential new transportation linkage. By late 2014, legislation in both states enabled a "public private partnership" or "P3", which allows private sector financing for constructing or operating a transportation facility.

=== Planning ===
The Illiana Expressway would become the third east–west expressway to connect northeastern Illinois and northwest Indiana. In 1953, the Kingery-Borman expressway combination opened. Subsequently, a part of Interstate 80, this route would become part of one of the most important coast-to-coast Interstate highways in the United States. The Chicago Skyway opened five years later, on April 16, 1958. With the newly opened Indiana Toll Road, the Skyway and Toll Road became part of a second coast-to-coast Interstate highway, as Interstate 90 ran through the city of Chicago proper.

The Skyway-Indiana Toll Road combination paralleled the shoreline of Lake Michigan, and was a popular road until the Dan Ryan Expressway opened in 1962, with Interstate 80/94 providing a free route from Chicago to northwestern Indiana. Ideas for an east–west limited access highway further south, connecting southern Lake County Indiana with Will County Illinois, have been studied by transportation planners in efforts prior to the current Illiana Corridor Study, notably by the following: South Suburban Freeway Study (Murphy Engineering, 1972); I-80/I-94 Congestion Relief Study (Wilbur Smith, 1992); Northwest Indiana Corridor Study (Burgess & Niple, 2000); and the South Suburban Airport (Tier One/Tier Two) (AECOM, 2002/In Progress).

In June 2010, governors Pat Quinn of Illinois and Mitch Daniels of Indiana formally initiated development of an Illiana Expressway under the heading of the "Illiana Corridor". The Illiana was first proposed a public-private partnership in which private investors would provide the capital funding for the road's construction in exchange for toll revenues, although those terms have more recently been changed to include significant upfront investment of public funds. The two states' transportation departments were charged with examining potential routes and proposing one through the formal federal interstate-highway planning process. In late 2012, the bi-state planning group released a draft Tier 1 environmental impact statement which was made final in January 2013. The Tier 2 process, which was initiated in January 2013 and concluded in September 2014, focused on the specific route for the project. The route, as specified in that report, would have run from Wilmington, Illinois to a point on I-65 east of Lowell, Indiana.

Because both northeastern Illinois and northwestern Indiana have state- and federally recognized regional planning agencies which have published formal regional plans, under federal law the Illiana Expressway must be reflected in those plans. The Illiana was listed as a fiscally unconstrained project in the "GOTO2040" plan published by the Chicago Metropolitan Agency for Planning (CMAP), and as an "illustrative" project in the 2040 Plan published by the Northwestern Indiana Regional Planning Commission (NIRPC). The Illiana Corridor planners requested both planning agencies to amend those plans to include the expressway as a regional priority project. A committee of CMAP approved the inclusion of the Illiana in its GOTO2040 plan in a meeting on October 17, 2013, and the NIRPC board approved the project's inclusion on December 12, 2013.

In 2014 IDOT hired Fitch Ratings to rate the project's financial viability; Fitch determined the Illiana "would not receive a favorable rating."

=== Official actions and status ===
In October 2013, CMAP's Transportation Committee voted 10–7, with 5 abstentions and 6 absences, to recommend to CMAP's board that the Illiana Expressway be included in the GOTO 2040 plan. The controversy continued to attract more media attention in the Chicago region. Sources told the Tribune that Chicago Mayor Rahm Emanuel had decided to oppose the expressway project, which was expected to mean that the city's representatives on the CMAP board would vote against including it in the regional plan. The CMAP vote did play out that way, resulting in the board voting 10–4 against the project's inclusion in the regional plan. That vote generated a fresh round of media and interest-group attention. CMAP's MPO Policy Committee, which under federal law held the final say on inclusion in the regional plan, met to act on the proposed project. The standing-room only public meeting attracted all major Chicago-area media outlets and all 19 members of the committee attended; more than three dozen citizens and local elected officials made public comments both pro and con. In the end the committee, chaired by IDOT Secretary Ann Schneider, who is an appointee of Governor Quinn, voted 11-8 for inclusion of the Illiana Expressway in the regional plan. Two of northeastern Illinois' transit agencies, PACE and Metra, received criticism for their representatives' Illiana votes on the MPO Policy Committee.

In December 2013, the Indiana Department of Transportation published its financing plan for the Indiana portion of the project, which was widely reported in NW Indiana newspapers. The Transportation Committee of NIRPC voted 18–8 to recommend the project to the planning agency's board. Two days later the agency's Environment Committee met but declined to vote on the issue. In the days leading up to NIRPC's December 12 vote on the project, a conversation began regarding the vote count: whether proportional voting would be based on population figures from the 2000 or 2010 federal census. The Northwestern Indiana Regional Planning Commission (NIRPC) approved the Illiana Corridor Project for its 2040 Comprehensive Regional Plan.

The project continued to be a point of controversy in October 2014, as CMAP's long-range transportation plan was again up for approval.

On December 11, 2014, the Federal Highway Administration (FHWA) approved the project, which allowed it to move from the planning phase to implementation phase.

After Bruce Rauner became governor of Illinois in 2015, he suspended development of the Illiana pending a cost-benefit review. Rauner's administration ultimately decided the project would be removed from IDOT's plans because "project costs exceed currently available resources."

In 2016, a federal judge struck down another environmental study that would have been used to justify a new tollway.

== Controversy ==
=== Opposition ===
In July 2013, two environmental groups and one local organization filed a federal lawsuit against the U.S. Department of Transportation and Federal Highway Administration, alleging that the federal agencies had violated federal law by signing off on an environmental impact study that failed to establish the need for the Illiana Expressway and that did not properly evaluate alternatives for the proposed route. When the Chicago Metropolitan Agency for Planning (CMAP) released a critical internal staff analysis of the proposed highway, it generated attention in the Chicago media. Cook County Board President Toni Preckwinkle wrote to Illinois Governor Patrick Quinn opposing the project. Preckwinkle voiced opposition again on July 30, 2014, arguing that IDOT's funding model "makes government the payer of first resort."

In December, Indiana GOP state representative Rick Niemeyer published an op-ed article explaining his opposition to the project. The Chicago Tribune included an editorial asking NIRPC to vote against the project. The Lake County (Indiana) Council passed a resolution opposing the project.

In April 2014, the Environmental Law and Policy Center filed a lawsuit alleging that CMAP violated its founding legislation in the process of approving the Illiana. This legislation requires that plans "shall be approved by the CMAP board prior to final approval," but the Illiana was given final approval after being rejected by the board.

In October 2014, the Illinois Public Interest Research Group issued a report that criticized the project as unnecessary based on transportation trends and irresponsible financially.

=== Support ===
Will County officials have continued to push for the road. Illinois Governor Pat Quinn and Indiana Governor Michael Pence also reiterated their support for the project. "Whether it’s the Illiana or any mode of transportation, you have to go where the demand is," Quinn said. Pence added, "You have to think regionally, because roads don’t stop at state borders." Tollroads News, a trade journal covering the construction of new toll highways, also wrote about the CMAP staff recommendation. The deputy director of Indiana's Department of Transportation described his agency's support for the project in a newspaper guest column. The column was printed again on December 8. The Times of Northwest Indiana, which was by then the largest daily newspaper in that region of the state, continued to editorialize in favor of the Illiana project.

U.S. Senators Dan Coats (R-IN) and Mark Kirk (R-IL) and U.S. Representative Pete Visclosky (D-IN) expressed their support for the project.

== Successor ==
Great Lakes Basin Transportation has proposed the privately funded Burnham Highway along the general route of the Illiana Expressway with extensions at each end as part of a plan which also includes the proposed Great Lakes Basin Railroad.

== See also ==
- Proposed Chicago south suburban airport
