= Consumer Federation of California =

- Abbreviation: CFC
- Established: 1960; 66 years ago
- Headquarters: 1225 Eighth Street, Suite 470
- Location: Sacramento, California, U.S.
- Executive Director: Robert Herrell
- Website: consumercal.org

The Consumer Federation of California (CFC) is a nonprofit consumer advocacy organization founded in 1960. CFC campaigns for state and federal laws and appears at the California state legislature in support of consumer-focused regulations. The Consumer Federation of California is led by Executive Director Robert Herrell and President Richard Holober.

CFC has advocated for medical and financial privacy, the prevention of elder abuse, strengthening food and product safety laws, regulation of private, for-profit colleges, eliminating household toxins, combating false advertising and fraud and creating access to civil justice.

The organization also intervenes in proceedings of the California Public Utilities Commission (CPUC), the California Department of Insurance (CDI) and participates in other state and federal regulatory proceedings.

CFC's main activities include:

- Advocating for laws and regulations that ensure consumer protection
- Directing consumer complaints to the appropriate government or non-profit agency.
- Educating the public and decision makers about consumer issues

== Legislative Scorecards ==
The Consumer Federation of California issues annual Legislative Scorecards that grade State Senators and Assembly members on the percentage of pro-consumer votes each lawmaker casts on consumer rights bills that were considered in the legislature that year.

== CFC California Bills 2015-2016 ==
=== CFC Sponsored Bills ===
SB 899 (Hueso) Women's juvenile, adult and senior products. (Died in Committee)

Would prohibit discriminatory pricing of goods based on the gender of the product's intended user.

SB 648 (Mendoza D) Health and care facilities: referral agencies. (Vetoed by Governor Brown)

Would require a referral agency to obtain a license in order to refer a person to a residential care facility for the elderly. The bill would prohibit a referral agency from holding any power of attorney or any other property of a person receiving referral services, or from disclosing any personal information of a person receiving services, unless expressly authorized to do so. The bill would require a referral agency to provide a statement disclosing any payment the agency received from a care facility.

AB 886 (Chau D) Transportation service network company: passenger privacy. (Died in Committee)

Would prohibit vehicle for hire companies from requesting or requiring personally identifiable data of a passenger unless the information is used for certain purposes, including establishing, maintaining, and updating a customer's account. The bill would require the transportation service network provider to provide an accountholder with an opportunity to cancel or terminate an account.

SB 178 (Leno) Electronic device information access: Privacy. (Enacted into law)

Requires a law enforcement agency to have a search warrant or subpoena before accessing the contents of a cell phone.

=== CFC Supported Bills ===
SB 763 (Leno D) Juvenile products: flame retardant chemicals. (In Committee Process)

Would require a manufacturer of juvenile products, such as bassinets, high chairs and strollers, to state whether the product contains toxic flame retardant chemicals.

=== CFC Opposed Bills ===
AB 925 (Low) Would have allowed businesses to secretly record cell phone conversations with customers. (Died)

AB 2395 (Low) Would have allowed copper carriers to abandon copper landlines beginning in 2020. (Died)

AB 2688 (Gordon) Would establish limited regulations for health and fitness apps and health information websites, but falls short of established California medical privacy law. (Opposed unless amended)

== Recent Rate Proceedings ==
1. Safeco Insurance Company of America: PA-2015-00007 (2015-2016)

2. Wawanesa General Insurance Company: PA-2015-0007 (2015-2016)

3. State Farm General Insurance Company: PA 2015-00004 (2015-2016)

4. California Capital Insurance Company: PA-2015-0002 (2014-2016)

5. Farmers Insurance Exchange: PA 2013-00011 (2013-2014)

6. Hartford Underwriters Insurance Company: PA-2014-00011 (2014 – 2015)

7. AIG Property and Casualty: PA 2013-00013 (2013-2014)

8. Infinity Insurance Company: PA-2014-00002, (2014)

9. State Farm General Insurance Company: PA 2013-00012 (2013-2014)

== Recent California Department of Insurance Proceedings ==
In 2015 CFC participated in California Department of Insurance Rulemaking Workshop entitled: Sale of Insurance on a Group Basis Pursuant to Insurance Code 1861.12.

In 2014, CFC participated in California Department of Insurance Public Hearing on Autonomous Vehicle Insurance Issues.

In 2012 CFC participated in California Department of Insurance rulemaking entitled: Standards for Repairs and Use of Aftermarket Car Parts, CDI File No. REG 2011 00024.

In 2012 CFC participated in California Department of Insurance rulemaking workshop entitled: Scope of Prior Approval, CDI File No. OV-2011-00076.

In 2008 CFC participated in California Department of Insurance rulemaking: Usage Based Auto Insurance, CDI File No. REG 2008-00020.

== Controversy ==
Because the Consumer Federation of CA takes positions in favor of consumers, it has been accused of anti-business bias by some business groups and conservative commentators. Several of the bills and regulations that CFC supports have been designated as “job killers” by the California Chamber of Commerce.

== CFC Education Foundation ==
The CFC publishes educational materials for the public on consumer issues and sponsors the CFC Education Foundation, a 501(C)(3) non-profit that works to serve the public interest.

== See also ==
- Consumer Federation of America
