= Gene Karpinski =

Gene Karpinski (born January 14, 1952) is the president of the League of Conservation Voters.

Karpinski is a graduate of Brown University and Georgetown University Law Center. Upon receipt of his J.D. in 1977, Karpinski joined Congress Watch, a division of Public Citizen, as field director. He continued in that role until 1981, when he moved on to a position as executive director with the Colorado Public Interest Research Group. After a stint with People For the American Way as field director, in 1984 Karpinski became the executive director of the United States Public Interest Research Group, the national lobbying office for state PIRGs across the country, a position he held for 21 years. He became president of the League of Conservation Voters in April 2006, after serving for more than a decade on the group's board of directors and political committee.

In September 2024, Karpinski announced that he would step down from the LCV in 2025 upon the appointment of a successor.
