= Ontario Public Interest Research Group =

Organization

Ontario Public Interest Research Group is a decentralized network of left wing publicly funded local Public Interest Research Groups located in the province of Ontario, Canada.

OPIRG was founded in 1972 after a speech by Ralph Nader at the University of Waterloo.

Unlike the U.S. PIRG, each OPIRG operates independently on the local level, with members deciding which action projects to pursue. OPIRG has no affiliations with the U.S. Public Interest Research Group.

Multiple OPIRG groups have been targets of defunding campaigns by conservative groups.
