= Joyce Elaine Roop =

American lawyer

Joyce Elaine Roop (1952–1995) was an attorney and environmental activist.

Born in Chicago, Roop attended the University of California at Santa Barbara, where she helped found the Isla Vista Recreation and Park District and was then elected to the initial board of directors. In 1976 she moved from Isla Vista to Massachusetts, where she studied at Northeastern University School of Law.

While a high school student in 1967, Roop joined a nationally publicized protest and marched from California's border with Oregon down the length of the state to a defense plant near Los Angeles to protest the US war in Vietnam.

After law school, Roop worked for Ralph Nader's Public Citizen Congress Watch organization and the Massachusetts Public Interest Research Group, where she spearheaded litigation to stop acid rain from coal-fired power plants.
