= Center for Economic Progress =

U.S. nonprofit organization

- Abbreviation: CEP
- Merged into: Ladder Up
- Formation: September 1990; 36 years ago
- Founded at: Chicago, Illinois
- Type: Nonprofit
- Tax ID no.: 36-3693728
- Headquarters: Chicago, Illinois
- Location: United States
- Services: Tax and financial services
- Revenue: $872,000 (2019)
- Expenses: $1.25 million (2019)
- Staff: 50
- Volunteers: 1000
- Award: Financial Stability Impact Award (2011)
- Formerly called: Center for Law & Human Services

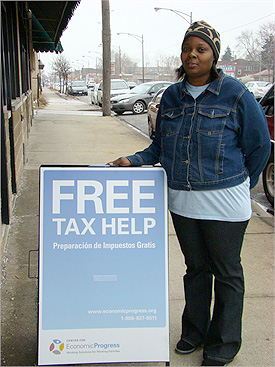
The Center for Economic Progress offers free tax help in Chicago neighborhoods.

The Center for Economic Progress (CEP) is a non-profit organization based in Chicago that provides free tax preparation and financial counseling services to low-income households. Since its founding, $400 million in tax refunds have been granted through CEP programs.

== History ==
The Center for Economic Progress was founded in Chicago in 1990, originally operating as the Center for Law and Human Services. Through the 2000s, the organization participated in the Internal Revenue Service's Volunteer Income Tax Assistance (VITA) program, providing free tax preparation services to low- and moderate-income households in Chicago and surrounding communities.

During the 2010s, the organization operated on a volunteer basis. Volunteers assisted Chicago taxpayers with federal and state tax credits, preparation services, and other related tax services.

=== Merger with Ladder Up ===
In 2020, the Center for Economic Progress merged with Ladder Up, another Chicago-based tax assistance organization.

== Services ==
As part of the IRS Volunteer Income Tax Assistance Program, CEP provides free tax preparation at sites in Chicago and surrounding Illinois during tax season to families that earn under $50,000 annually or individuals who earn under $25,000. It also promoted the 2010 US Census at its tax sites in neighborhoods that showed especially low response rates in 2000.

CEP employs approximately 50 staff members and recruits more than one thousand volunteer tax preparers each year.
