= Stephen Brobeck =

American consumer rights activist (born 1944)

Stephen Brobeck is a senior fellow at the Consumer Federation of America. He previously held the position of executive director from 1980 to 2018.

== Early life and education ==
Brobeck was born in 1944. He did undergraduate studies at Wheaton College and got his doctorate at University of Pennsylvania.

In the late 1960s Brobeck was active in the opposition to the U.S. involvement in the Vietnam War.

== Career ==
Following the completion of his Ph.D., Brobeck was an assistant professor at Case Western Reserve University. While there, he assisted with initiating and organizing Cleveland Consumer Action.

From 1976 to 1979, Brobeck served on the board of the Consumer Federation of America. He served as the organization's executive director from 1980 to 2018, then retired and became a senior fellow.

Brobeck was director of the Federal Reserve Bank of Richmond from 1990 to 1996.

Brobeck has published on banking and product safety. Brobeck edited the Encyclopedia of the Consumer Movement.
