= Dana R. Fisher =

American sociologist

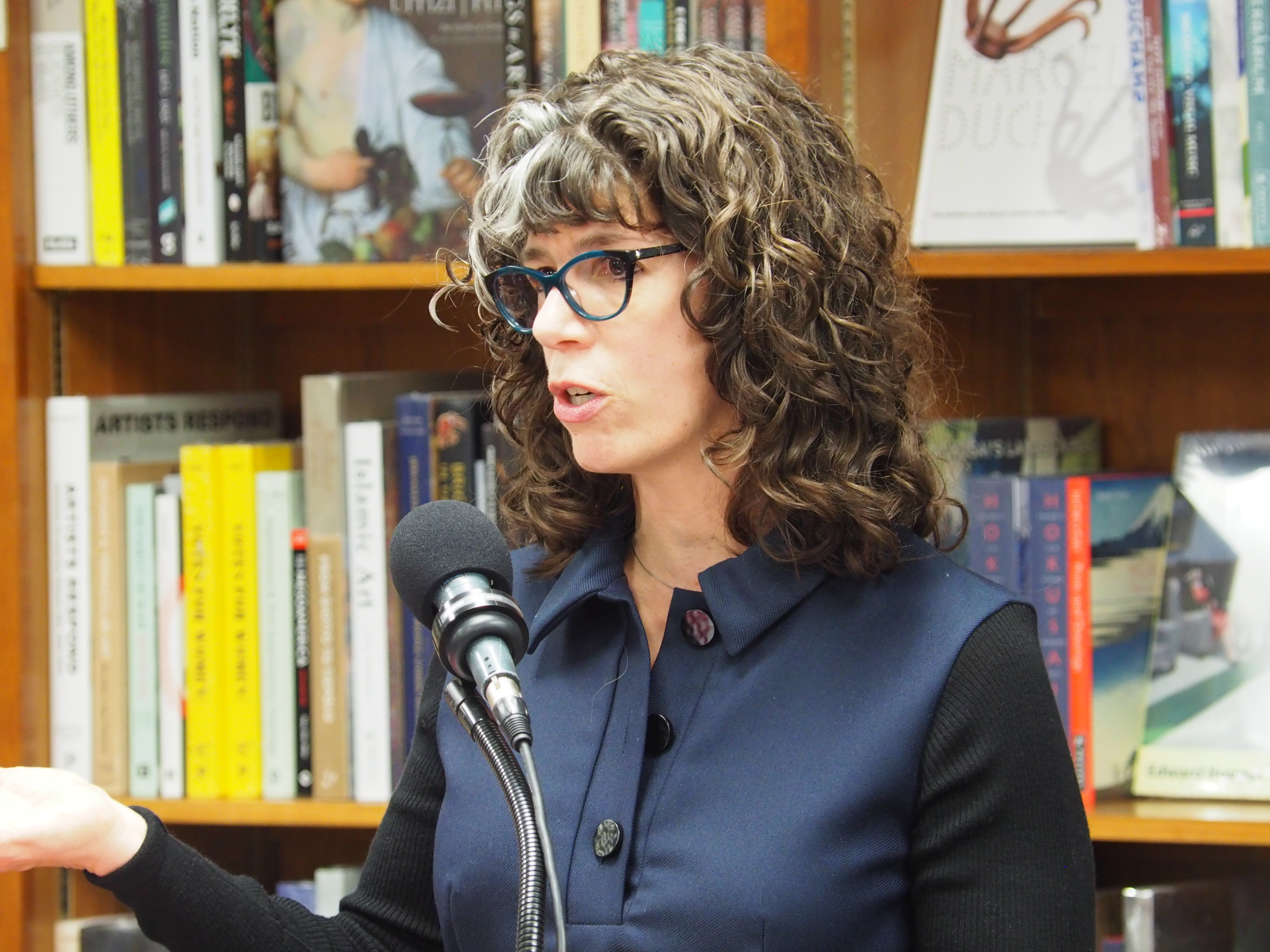
Fisher in 2019

Dana R. Fisher is an American sociologist, professor of sociology, public speaker, and author. She is the director of the Center for Environment, Community, and Equity and a professor in the School of International Service at American University. Her areas of research and expertise are activism, democracy, the climate crisis, and environmental policy.

Her most recent book is Saving Ourselves: From Climate Shocks to Climate Action (2024). She is also author of American Resistance: from the Women’s March to the Blue Wave (2019) and Activism Inc.: How the Outsourcing of Grassroots Campaigns Is Strangling Progressive Politics in America (2006).

She is a self-described climate apocalyptic optimist and co-developed (with Andrew Jorgenson) the framework of AnthroShift to explain how social actors are reconfigured in the aftermath of widespread perceptions and experiences of risk.

== Career ==
Fisher graduated with an AB in East Asian Studies and Environmental Studies from Princeton University, an MS in Sociology from the University of Wisconsin-Madison, and a Ph.D. in Sociology from the University of Wisconsin-Madison. She was awarded the Katherine DuPre Lumpkin Award for the best doctoral dissertation in the Department of Sociology at the University of Wisconsin-Madison.

Prior to her appointment to American University, Fisher's previous faculty positions were at University of Maryland, Columbia University, the Sciences Po, and University of Konstanz. Her Research has been featured in media outlets such as The Washington Post, The Christian Science Monitor, Chicago Tribune, USA Today, CBS News, NPR, the No Jargon podcast of the Scholars Strategy Network, and in "The Collectors: Political Action," a documentary short by FiveThirtyEight and ESPN Films.

Fisher was a contributing author on citizen engagement and civic activism for the 2021 Sixth Assessment Report of the Intergovernmental Panel on Climate Change.

== Publications ==
=== Books ===
- Dana R. Fisher. (2024). Saving Ourselves: From Climate Shocks to Climate Action. New York: Columbia University Press
- Dana R. Fisher. (2019). American Resistance: from the Women’s March to the Blue Wave. New York: Columbia University Press
- Dana R. Fisher, Erika S. Svendsen, and James Connolly. (2015). Urban Environmental Stewardship and Civic Engagement: How Planting Trees Strengthens the Roots of Democracy. New York: Routledge.
- Shamus Khan and Dana R. Fisher. (2013). The Practice of Research: How Social Scientists Answer Their Questions. New York: Oxford University Press.
- Stewart Lockie, David A. Sonnenfeld, and Dana R. Fisher (editors). (2013). Routledge International Handbook of Social and Environmental Change. New York: Routledge.
- Dana R. Fisher. (2006). Activism, Inc.: How the Outsourcing of Grassroots Campaigns is Strangling Progressive Politics in America. Palo Alto: Stanford University Press.
- Dana R. Fisher. (2004). National Governance and the Global Climate Change Regime. New York: Rowman & Littlefield.

=== Journal articles ===
- Dana R. Fisher, Joseph Waggle, and Lorien Jasny. (2015). "Not a Snowball's Chance for Science." Contexts. Fall: 44–49.
- Lorien Jasny, Joseph Waggle, and Dana R. Fisher. (2015). "An Empirical Examination of Echo Chambers in US Climate Policy Networks." Nature Climate Change. 5:782-786.
- Dana R. Fisher. (2013). "Understanding the relationship between subnational and national climate change politics in the United States: toward a theory of boomerang federalism." Environment and Planning C: Government and Policy. 31:769-784.
- Dana R. Fisher, Joseph Waggle, and Philip Leifeld. (2013). "Where Does Political Polarization Come From? Locating Polarization within the U.S. Climate Change Debate." American Behavioral Scientist. 57(1):70-92.
- Dana R. Fisher, Philip Leifeld, and Yoko Iwaki. (2013). "Mapping the Ideological Networks of American Climate Politics." Climatic Change. 116:523-545.
- Dana R. Fisher (2012). "Youth Political Participation: Bridging Activism and Electoral Politics." Annual Review of Sociology. 38:119-137.
- Dana R. Fisher and Paul-Brian McInerney. (2012). "The Limits of Networks in Social Movement Retention: On Canvassers and Their Careers." Mobilization. 17(2):109-128.

=== Book chapters ===
- Dana R. Fisher and Anya M. Galli. (2015). "Civil Society Engagement in Climate Governance: Between Collaboration and Conflict." Research Handbook on Climate Governance. Karin Bäckstrand and Eva Lövbrand, editors. Cheltenham: Edward Elgar Publishing. pp. 297–309.
