= Minnesota Public Interest Research Group =

Organization

- Formation: February 17, 1971; 55 years ago
- Headquarters: Minneapolis, Minnesota, U.S.
- Exec. Dir.: Ryan Kennedy
- Chair: Jayce Koester
- Vice Chair: Jenny Hunken
- Treasurer: Samuel Doten
- Website: mpirg.org, this link no longer works.
- Remarks: url usurped archive-url = https://web.archive.org/web/20170828100045/https://mpirg.org (2017-08-28)

The Minnesota Public Interest Research Group (also known as MPIRG) describes itself as "a grassroots, non-partisan, nonprofit, student-directed organization that empowers and trains students and engages the community to take collective action in the public interest throughout the state of Minnesota." It was part of the Public Interest Research Group federation of advocacy organizations.

== History ==
MPIRG was incorporated on February 17, 1971; the concept was founded and supported by consumer advocate Ralph Nader. Students at the University of Minnesota collected 25,200 signatures that year to start the first MPIRG chapter in Minnesota and start the first PIRG in the nation. College students collected nearly 50,000 signatures in all to start chapters at college campuses across the state. The motivating idea was for students to join together in collective action to advocate in the public interest, and to use the activity fees they collected from each school to support a staff of professionals that could train them to become powerful advocates in the public policy arena. MPIRG's unique strategy to mobilize students has led to a long list of accomplishments, including protecting the Boundary Waters Canoe Area Wilderness in northern Minnesota from environmental damage and promoting stricter ethical standards for lobbyists.

== Chapters ==
MPIRG had chapters at six colleges and universities across the state of Minnesota, including:

- Augsburg University – inactive since 2018
- Hamline University – inactive since 2017
- St. Catherine University – inactive since 2018
- University of Minnesota Duluth – the only active chapter currently
- University of Minnesota Morris – inactive since 2018
- University of Minnesota Twin Cities – inactive since 2018, since they merged with USPIRG

== See also ==
- Consumer protection
- Public interest law
