= Encyclopedia of the Consumer Movement =

Economics book

- Author: 168 authors, Stephen Brobeck is editor
- Subject: Consumer movement
- Genre: Reference work
- Publisher: ABC-CLIO
- Publication date: 1997
- Publication place: United States
- Pages: 274
- ISBN: 0-87436-987-8
- LC Class: HC79.C63E53 1997

The Encyclopedia of the Consumer Movement is a 1997 encyclopedia edited by Stephen Brobeck and which describes the history of the consumer movement and other topics related to consumerism.

== Synopsis ==
The work contains 198 entries written by 168 authors. The scope is the history, activities, interests, legislation, and actors in the twentieth century consumer movement. Focuses of the work include 40 articles each describing the consumer movement in a different country, various articles on specific actions undertaken by consumer activists, and descriptions of the interests of specific populations or demographics in the consumer movement.

The authors include established persons from academia, government, activism, and regulatory organizations who wrote entries summarizing their own fields of expertise.

== Reviews ==
One reviewer called the work "the only comprehensive reference source of its kind." Another said that "In its depth, breadth, scholarship, and readability, this volume will be considered the standard reference source for many years".
