= New York Public Interest Research Group =

American political organization

NYPIRG, Inc.
- Type: Nonprofit
- Industry: Nonprofit & Activism
- Founded: 1973
- Headquarters: New York State, United States
- Key people: Blair Horner, Gene Russianoff, Russ Haven
- Revenue: 3,404,320 United States dollar (2016)
- Total assets: 2,477,583 United States dollar (2022)
- Website: NYPIRG

The New York Public Interest Research Group (NYPIRG) is a New York statewide student-directed, non-partisan, not for profit political organization. It has existed since 1973. Its current executive director is Megan Ahearn and its founding director was Donald K. Ross.

NYPIRG is directed by a student-run and student-elected Board of Directors. Any issue that NYPIRG works on, or stance it takes, must be approved by its student board of directors. NYPIRG is one of the largest of the Public Interest Research Groups, which were inspired by Ralph Nader in the 1970s, and operate at the state level. After leaving Columbia University, former U.S. President Barack Obama worked at NYPIRG at its City College Chapter.

NYPIRG works on a variety of socioeconomic issues such as college affordability, consumer protection, sustainable energy, government accountability, hunger & homelessness, public transportation in New York City, and voter rights.

== Infrastructure ==
NYPIRG has an office in lower Manhattan, New York City, and a legislative office located in Albany. NYPIRG also operates dozens of campus and regional offices statewide.

== Campus program ==
The focus of NYPIRG's program is the campus chapters. Campus chapters exist at schools in the State University of New York (SUNY), City University of New York (CUNY), and two private colleges (Pratt Institute and Syracuse University). The chapters are funded by activity fees which are voted on by students, and/or determined by student governments.

=== Chapter locations ===
- Binghamton University
- Borough of Manhattan Community College
- Bronx Community College
- Brooklyn College
- City College of New York
- SUNY Cortland
- Hunter College
- SUNY New Paltz
- New York City College of Technology
- Pratt Institute
- SUNY Purchase
- Queens College
- Queensborough Community College
- College of Staten Island
- Syracuse University - SUNY College of Environmental Science and Forestry
