= Fair Share Action =

American Super PAC

- Formation: August 2012
- Type: Super PAC
- Purpose: To support Democratic candidates and oppose Republican candidates
- Location: Denver, Colorado
- Affiliations: Fair Share
- Website: www.fairshareaction.org

Fair Share Action is a left-leaning American super PAC that seeks to elect Democratic candidates to political office. Fair Share Action is an unaffiliated Super PAC. It shares a name with the 501(c)(4) Fair Share.

Fair Share Action was launched in Colorado in August 2012. The super PAC is heavily funded by Tim Gill, a computer software entrepreneur and LGBT rights activist. Fair Share Action also received $550,000 in seed funding from Environment America. Billionaire Tom Steyer, the National Education Association, and America Votes have also funded Fair Share Action.

The group's initial activities included get out the vote efforts in Colorado, Florida, and New Hampshire for President Barack Obama's 2012 re-election campaign. In 2014, Fair Share Action reported spending $4,363,917 on federal electoral efforts, including more than $1.5 million on efforts to re-elect former Democratic U.S. Senator Mark Udall, who was ultimately defeated. In the July 15, 2016 Report of Disbursements, Fair Share Action was named as a donor to Correct the Record, a political action group exposing political opponents of Hillary Clinton and the Democratic Party.
