= Rhoda Karpatkin =

American consumer advocate (1930–2023)

Rhoda Karpatkin (June 7, 1930 – August 4, 2023) was an American lawyer and consumers rights activist who was the president of the Consumer's Union, the publisher of Consumer Reports.

== Early life and education ==
Rhoda Alayne Hendrick was born on June 7, 1930, in Brooklyn, New York. Her father Charles and mother Augusta Hendrick were immigrants from Eastern Europe. She graduated from Lafayette High School. She then attended Brooklyn College, graduating in 1951. In college she edited The Vanguard, a student newspaper. Karpatkin graduated from Yale Law School in 1953.

== Career ==
From 1954 to 1974, Karpatkin practiced law, specializing in education civil rights, civil liberties, and consumer law. She represented the American Civil Liberties Union and conscientious objectors to the Vietnam War. She was outside counsel for the Consumers Union from 1958 to 1974.

In 1974, she was chosen to be the executive director of the Consumer's Union, the publisher of Consumer Reports, becoming the first woman to hold the job. Karpatkin led the organization through recession and debt issues. She increased the budget by a factor of 10, to $157 million.

Karpatkin saw both product testing and advocacy as linked issues, leading to a dispute with Nader who left the board over it. She had an auto-test track and new research laboratories built.

Karpatkin was a central figure in the consumer rights movement of the 1970s, along with Ralph Nader and Joan Claybrook.

In 2000, the year before she retired, the magazine had 4.3 million subscribers and at the time the largest paid-subscriber website with 350,000 users.

Karpatkin retired in 2001.

Her papers from her time at Consumer Reports were given to Duke University in 2019.

== Personal life and death ==
In 1951, she married Marvin M. Karpatkin. Together they had one daughter and two sons. Her husband died in 1975.

On August 4, 2023, Karpatkin died of brain cancer at her home in Manhattan. She was 93.
