= Legislative scorecard =

A legislative scorecard, in North American parlance, refers to any ranked balanced scorecard used by advocacy groups to rank sitting legislators or candidates for legislative office on their voting record. It is also used to refer to ranked indexes of introduced or ratified legislation on certain criteria.

Scorecards are usually aggregated on an annual basis, and are often composed by political advocacy groups as educative tools for voters in their decision-making at the ballot box. They are also useful for endorsement of candidates by other organizations.

== Notable legislative scorecards ==
- AFL–CIO
- American Civil Liberties Union
- American Conservative Union
- Americans for Democratic Action
- Americans for Prosperity
- Family Research Council
- FreedomWorks
- Heritage Action
- Human Rights Campaign
- Humane Society
- League of Conservation Voters
- NAACP
- National Taxpayers Union
- Planned Parenthood
- Progressive Public Health and Environmental Scorecard (National Nurses United, Food & Water Watch, and Progressive Democrats of America)
