= Great Lakes Basin Railroad =

Overview
- Locale: Wisconsin, Illinois, Indiana
- Dates of operation: Proposed 2019–

Other
- Website: www.greatlakesbasin.net

The Great Lakes Basin Railroad is a proposed railroad in Wisconsin, Illinois, and Indiana. The intended route bypasses Chicago to avoid its rail congestion, running from Janesville, Wisconsin, to Michigan City, Indiana. The project's estimated cost is $8 billion, privately financed.

On May 1, 2017, the Great Lake Basin Railroad filed its construction application with the Surface Transportation Board. On August 30, 2017, the Surface Transportation Board unanimously rejected GLB's application.
