= League of Conservation Voters =

American environmental advocacy organization

- Formation: 1969-1970
- Founder: Marion Edey
- Type: 501(c)(4) with associated political action committee and super PAC
- Purpose: Environmental advocacy
- Headquarters: Washington, D.C.
- President: Gene Karpinski
- Revenue: $159.27 million (2024)
- Expenses: $146.58 million (2024)
- Website: lcv.org

The League of Conservation Voters (LCV) is an American environmental advocacy group. Through its affiliated super PAC, it is a major supporter of the Democratic Party. The organization pursues its goals through voter education, voter mobilization, and direct contributions to political candidates. LCV includes 29 state affiliates. LCV was founded in 1970 by environmentalist Marion Edey, with support from David Brower. The group's current president is Gene Karpinski. It is headquartered in Washington, D.C., and has over two million members.

The LCV's affiliated super PAC spends money supporting Democratic candidates and opposing Republicans; it spent $120 million in 2024 in support of Kamala Harris and other Democrats. As a 501(c)(4) nonprofit, the LCV does not legally need to disclose its donors and can make unlimited contributions to super PACs.

== History ==
The League of Conservation Voters was founded by Marion Edey, then a young congressional staffer, who proposed a non-partisan, national pressure group for environmentalists "analogous to a political party" but endorsing Democrats and Republicans in a 1969 letter to David Brower, soon after he resigned from the Sierra Club. Brower strongly endorsed Edey's idea and came up with the name League of Conservation Voters, insisting that Edey run the new organization. The plan to form LCV as an arm of Brower's new environmental organization, Friends of the Earth, was announced in September 1969. However, as it would have violated the Federal Corrupt Practices Act for LCV to be a subsidiary of a non-profit corporation like Friends of the Earth, Edey launched the organization as an independent political committee in 1970.

That fall, she hired as her first employee Research Director James Rathlesberger to cover presidential politics beginning in 1971 while she concentrated on congressional. In 1972, they published environmental policy profiles of the leading presidential candidates and Rathlesberger edited an LCV Report, Nixon and the Environment (Village Voice Books, 1972). The profiles were widely covered in the news as was the book by reviews, raising the level of these issues in presidential politics. Not a factor given the controversies of the 1972 campaign, they were by 1976 with Jimmy Carter’s rise.

As of 2012, Green Tech Action Fund and the Advocacy Fund were among LCV's donors. In 2024, the group's top donors included former New York City Mayor Michael Bloomberg, Reuben Munger, Giovanna Randall, T. A. Barron, and Adam Lewis.

In September 2024, longtime LCV president Gene Karpinski announced that he would step down from the organization in 2025 upon the appointment of a successor.

The LCV was the 20th largest donor in the 2024 campaign, spending $42.5 million in support of Democratic candidates. That same year, LCV was part of a $55 million advertising campaign running climate related advertisements in six swing states on behalf of Kamala Harris.

== Activities ==
The organization's main activities include voter education, voter mobilization, tracking voting records, endorsing or opposing candidates for political office, and financially contributing to political campaigns.

The related League of Conservation Voters Action Fund (LCVAF) financially supports political candidates, most of whom are members of the Democratic Party. According to OpenSecrets, LCVAF was the top-spending, non-disclosing liberal group in the 2012 election cycle, investing about $11 million in political advertisements. LCV spent a total of $36 million in 2012.

LCV annually names a "Dirty Dozen", a list of politicians whom the group aims to defeat because of their voting records on conservation issues. The original "Dirty Dozen" list was developed in partnership with Environmental Action in 1970.

LCV strongly opposed many of President George W. Bush's environmental policies.

In 2014, LCV and the Natural Resources Defense Council Action Fund launched LeadingGreen, a joint initiative to address climate change. In 2015, LeadingGreen was added to the Democracy Alliance's funding portfolio.

LCV strongly opposed the administration of President Donald Trump and its environmental policies. In September 2018, the pac pledged $60 million to help green candidates. Ultimately, in the mid-term elections of 2018, the pac spent $80 million to support "green" candidates through its Victory Fund. They "had enormous success electing its endorsed candidates in suburban districts last fall," wrote The Atlantic on January 3, 2019.

As of August 2026, the organization spent $18.8 million in support of Democratic candidates in the 2026 United States elections.

=== National Environmental Scorecard ===
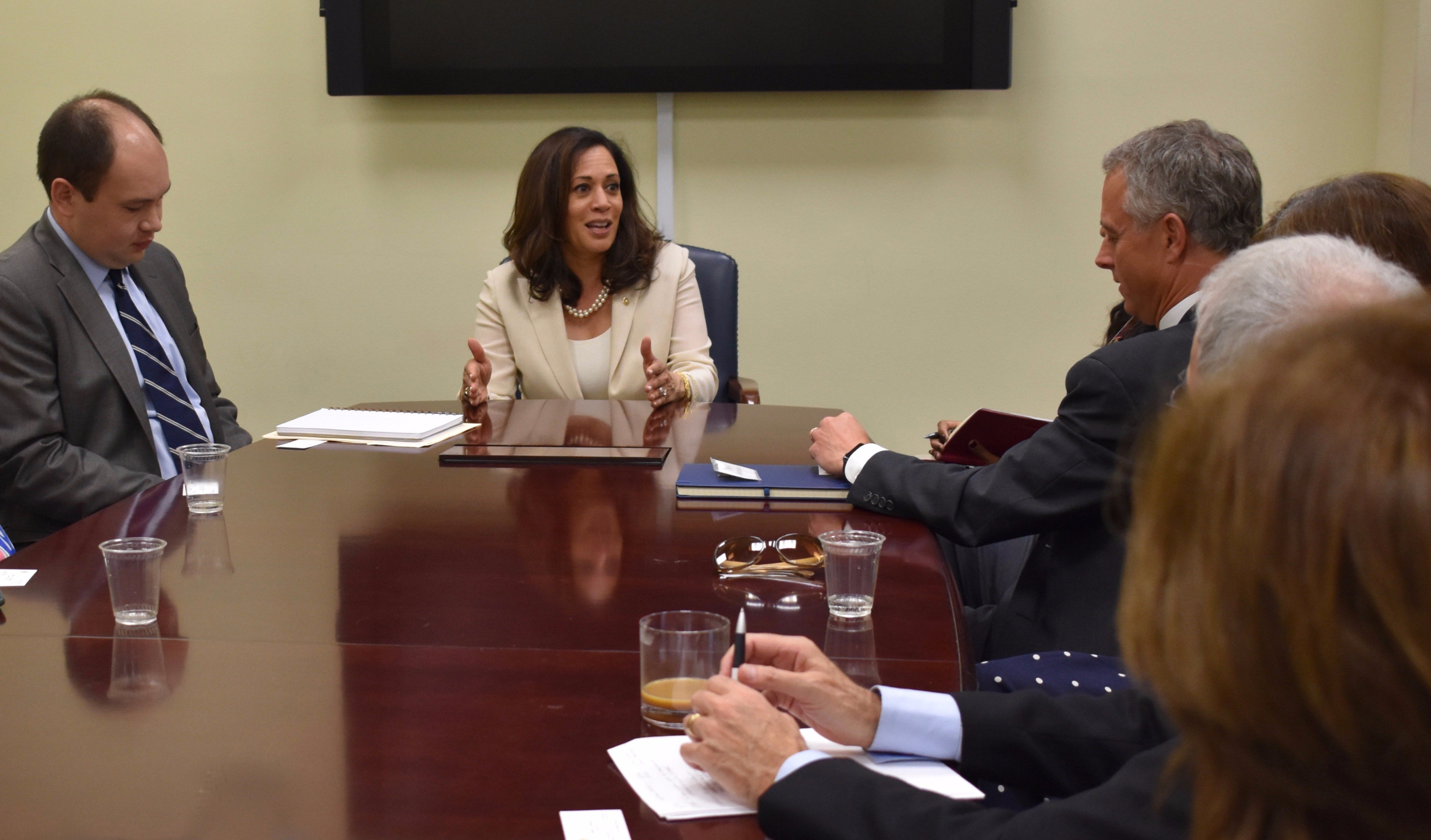
Then-senator Kamala Harris meeting with the LCV in 2017. As of 2019, Harris had a 100% rating.

LCV tracks the voting records of members of Congress on environmental issues in its National Environmental Scorecard, a legislative scorecard.

The average scores for members of the Democratic Party are historically higher than the scores for members of the Republican Party. According to ThinkProgress, a very low score on the Scorecard means a member of Congress has not "used their time in Congress to vote with the environment in mind." In 2002, Kimberley Strassel of The Wall Street Journal editorial board wrote that "Democratic politics...is what really drives the league's scorecard."

In a 2012 report, the non-profit Rachel's Network examined the Scorecard scores for male and female members of Congress in the 107th through the 111th Congresses (2001 to 2010). The group found that "women in Congress vote for legislation supporting clean air, clean water, renewable energy, climate action, and public health much more often than their male counterparts." The report found that some of the difference was attributable to the fact that there were "more women Democrats in both houses of Congress than there are women Republicans," and Democrats favor more pro-environmental policies, but also found that "the difference in voting patterns still persists when gender is isolated within each political party." The report also found that "the gap between Republican men and women narrowed after the 2004 election cycle, which could be attributable to increased partisan pressures."

The Scorecard has been cited by The New York Times, The Washington Post, Bloomberg News, U.S. News & World Report, HuffPost, and Scientific American magazine.

In 1998, scholar Anne Y. Ilinitch and collaborators used the Scorecard "to identify Senators and Representatives with unsupportive environmental voting records" in evaluated corporate political contributions as a measure of corporate environmental performance. In 2004, researchers at the School of Forestry and Wildlife Sciences at Auburn University averaged Scorecard scores across a state's congressional delegation as a proxy variable for the "green-ness" of constituents, and found no significant relationship with the number of Endangered Species Act listings in a state. In 2012, Robert Brulle and his collaborators investigated factors affecting U.S. public concern about the threat of climate change and found that "the message sent to the public by the Republican voting record on environmental bills is very influential...This result provides strong confirmation of the role of elite cues and their influence on public concern about climate change. In an extremely partisan environment, Republican votes against environmental bills legitimate public opinion opposed to action on climate change."

== See also ==
- 1970 in the environment
- Sustainability
- Ecology
