= Activism, Inc. =

2005 book by Dana Fisher

- Author: Dana R. Fisher
- Publication date: 2006
- ISBN: 9-780-80475217-6

Activism, Inc.: How the Outsourcing of Grassroots Campaigns Is Strangling Progressive Politics in America is a book by the sociologist Dana Fisher, based on an ethnographic study of Fund for Public Interest Research canvass offices during summer 2003. Fisher argues that the corporate fund-raising model mistreats idealistic young people by using them as interchangeable parts and providing them with insufficient training. Fisher also believes that the outsourcing of grassroots organizing by political groups led to the decay of grassroots infrastructure and opportunities for involvement on the left.

Fisher was inspired by her own experience as a canvasser and a 2001 lecture by the scholar Harry Boyte.

== Publication details ==
- Fisher, Dana. Activism, Inc.: How the Outsourcing of Grassroots Campaigns Is Strangling Progressive Politics in America, Stanford University Press, 2006 ISBN 978-0-8047-5217-6
