= Environment America =

U.S. federation of state-based environmental advocacy groups

- Founded: 2007
- Type: Nonprofit
- Tax ID no.: 20-5355252
- Legal status: 501(c)(4)
- Location: (United States) Denver, Colorado
- Fields: Environmentalism
- Key people: Wendy Wendlandt, President; Doug Phelps, Chairman
- Revenue: $14.4 million (2024)
- Expenses: $10.69 million (2024)
- Website: environmentamerica.org

Environment America is a federation of state-based environmental advocacy organizations in the United States. The organization researches and advocates for environmental policies through lobbying, litigation, and the mobilization of public support. Environment America advocates new laws and policies to address climate change, air pollution and water pollution, and is a proponent of clean energy, while opposing offshore drilling.

== History ==
On November 5, 2007, Environment America separated from the state Public Interest Research Groups (PIRG), bringing with it the organization's national environmental advocacy program. The federation combined several small, state-based advocacy groups that had already separated from the PIRGs. As a result of the separation of the organizations, the PIRGs' scope of work was defined as consumer, health, and safety issues while Environment America became responsible for the group's previous environmental work. Doug Phelps, who helped build the state PIRG network, became the group's new chair.

== Aims and activities ==
Environment America works to publicize and gain support for solving environmental problems in the United States. Its areas of interest include the use of renewable energy sources, climate change, air pollution, fossil fuel dependency, environmental conservation, and offshore drilling. The organization releases reports on topics such as wind energy policy, solar energy, global warming, mercury pollution, companies’ compliance with the Clean Water Act, energy efficient buildings, extreme weather in the U.S., fuel efficient cars, and levels of carcinogens in waterways.

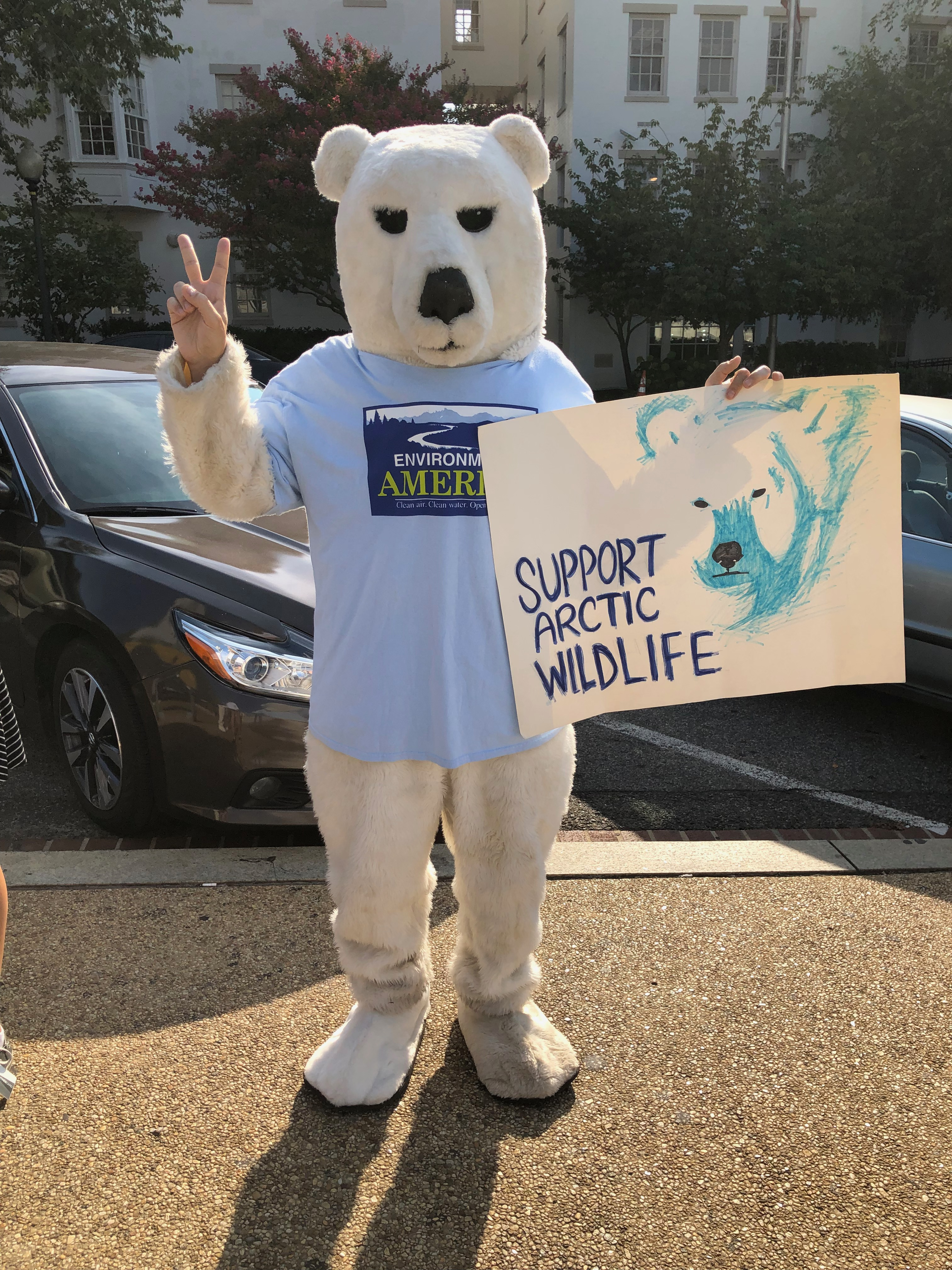
Climate activist at Capitol South Metro in 2019

Environment America has worked on various environmental policies, including supporting the American Clean Energy and Security Act and the Clean Power Plan to reduce climate pollution; the Clean Water Rule to include streams and wetlands in Clean Water Act protections; and the EPA's proposal for a revised fuel economy label.

The organization has sought to influence environmental policy through politics. Environment America publishes an annual scorecard of members of the U.S. Congress based on how they voted on environmental issues in that year's session. Members of the Democratic Party typically score higher than members of the Republican Party on the scorecard. The organization has endorsed both Republican and Democratic candidates during national elections. In 2008 and 2012, it joined the Sierra Club, League of Conservation Voters and Clean Water Action in endorsing Barack Obama’s reelection to office.

In 2012, Environment America contributed $550,000 to Fair Share Action, an independent expenditure committee also funded by Tim Gill. The group conducted get-out-the-vote efforts in support of President Barack Obama during his 2012 reelection campaign.

== Ratings ==
In its December 1, 2019, evaluation of Environment America, Charity Navigator gave the organization two of four stars, with two stars for "financial" and three stars for "accountability and transparency". With respect to the latter, several concerns were indicated by Charity Navigator: the FY 2018 Form 990 audited financials did not appear to be prepared by an independent accountant, and the organization's website lacked an easily accessible donor privacy policy and audited financials.

== State affiliates ==
Environment America has 29 state affiliates, including Environment California and Environment Oregon.

=== Environment California ===
Environment California has supported environmental campaigns within California including statewide bans on plastic bags, the reduction of energy inefficient appliances, and the expansion of the state's solar metering program and solar energy production. The advocacy group has also worked to reform California’s renewable energy policies. Environment California supported a law that Governor Jerry Brown signed in 2011 which mandated that 33% of the state's energy must come from renewable sources by 2020, an increase from the previous requirement of 20%.

Environment California released reports on the energy consumption of public schools, solar projects on school campuses, Californian cities' solar power production, "green job" training programs within the state, and the costs of fossil fuels.

=== Environment Texas ===
In 2009, Environment Texas and the Sierra Club filed similar lawsuits against Chevron Phillips for alleged violations of pollution limits and Shell for alleged illegal air pollution emissions. Shell agreed to pay a $5.8 million settlement, reduce emissions from its Deer Park refinery by 80%, upgrade chemical units, and reduce gas flaring. The following year, the environmental groups sued the largest oil refinery in the United States, ExxonMobil, accusing it of violating the Clean Air Act through the release of emissions from refineries and chemical plants in the Texas Gulf coast.

=== PennEnvironment ===
PennEnvironment has released several reports that analyze environmental concerns in Pennsylvania including counties' recycling fees, the dumping of toxic chemicals by industrial facilities into the state’s waterways, and the building of roads and logging in the Allegheny National Forest. Another report released by the state affiliate found that power plants fueled by coal in the state release large amounts of pollution that contribute to unhealthy smog and put susceptible populations at risk. In 2011, PennEnvironment condemned the government's decision to reject stricter air pollution regulations that would diminish ground-level ozone, the main component of harmful smog.

In 2012, PennEnvironment, along with the Sierra Club, sued PPG Industries for the contamination of lagoons and a solid waste landfill at the company's Ford City site near the Allegheny River which resulted from the disposal of glass polishing waste. Chemical testing revealed high levels of arsenic, lead, antimony, iron and chromium at the site. The environmental groups claimed that the company violated the Clean Water Act and Resources Conservation and Recovery Act and failed to follow an administrative order issued by the DEP under the Pennsylvania Clean Streams Law to clean up the site in 2009.
