= Action for a Change =

1971 book by Ralph Nader and Donald Ross

- Author: Ralph Nader, Donald Kemp Ross
- Publisher: Grossman Publishers
- Publication date: 1971
- ISBN: 978-0-670-10319-5

Action for a Change. A Student's Manual for Public Interest Organizing is a 1971 book written by consumer advocate Ralph Nader with Donald K. Ross, Brett English, and Joseph Highland. The book serves as a manual for college students establishing Public Interest Research Groups (PIRGs), and chronicles the formation of PIRGs in Oregon and Minnesota.
