= Public Interest Research Group =

Organization

U.S. PIRG
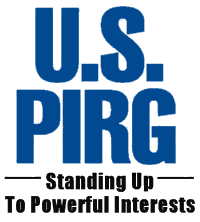
- Formation: 1984; 42 years ago
- Type: Advocacy organization
- Location: United States
- Key people: Doug Phelps (Chairman); Faye Park (President)
- Website: uspirg.org

Public Interest Research Groups (PIRGs) are U.S. and Canadian non-profit organizations that employ research, public education, grassroots organizing and direct advocacy on issues such as consumer protection, clear water and air, waste and recycling, energy, public health and transportation. Many of the PIRGs are closely affiliated with the Fund for the Public Interest, which conducts fundraising and canvassing on their behalf.

== History ==
The PIRGs emerged in the early 1970s on U.S. college campuses. The PIRG model was proposed in the book Action for a Change by Ralph Nader and Donald Ross, in which they encourage students on campuses across a state to pool their resources to hire full-time professional lobbyists and researchers to lobby for the passage of legislation which addresses social topics of interest to students. Ross helped students across the country set up the first PIRG chapters, then became the director of the New York Public Interest Research Group in 1973.

The Minnesota Public Interest Research Group, founded in 1971, was the first state PIRG to incorporate. It was followed by Oregon (OSPIRG) and Massachusetts (MASSPIRG). By the late 1990s, there were PIRGs in 22 states with chapters on more than 100 college campuses. U.S. PIRG reported 1 million members by 2000. The state PIRGs created U.S. PIRG in 1984 to have a national lobbying presence in Washington, D.C.

In their first two decades, PIRGs worked on a variety of issues:

- Bottle bills: Beginning in the late 1970s and continuing into the 1980s, the PIRGs were supportive of container deposit legislation in the United States, popularly called "bottle bills". MASSPIRG lobbied for six years for enactment of a state bottle return law, eventually winning container deposit legislation in 1982.
- Toy safety: U.S. PIRG has released toy safety reports every year since 1986, which has led to recalls of more than 35 toys.
- Lemon law: ConnPIRG and CALPIRG were involved in passing the first new-car lemon laws in 1982 that require manufacturers to repair or repurchase severely defective relatively new vehicles.
- Safer art supplies: CALPIRG led the effort to enact the nation's first laws protecting children and artists from toxins in art supplies in 1985. USPIRG followed with a federal law in 1988.

== Funding model ==
PIRGs on college campuses have historically been funded through the use of automatic billing with a portion of student activity fees in the form of a labor checkoff or in the form of automatically enrolled dues to the association. Students may elect at some institutions to have the fees refunded to them or opt-out, although many students are unaware that this is the case. At some institutions, opting out of the fee only lasts one academic term, requiring students who do not wish to be members and pay dues to have to opt-out. In 1982, the PIRGs established the Fund for the Public Interest (commonly referred to as "the Fund") as its fundraising and canvassing arm.

== Controversies ==
=== Student fees ===
The student fee system of PIRG funding has been met with controversy and with a number of legal challenges. In 2014, students at Macalester College in Minnesota voted to end their relationship with MPIRG due to the group's revenue structure, which relied on Minnesota Public Interest Research Group (MPIRG) automatically receiving a cut of student activity fees.

In 2022, the PIRG campus affiliate was shut down at the University of Connecticut after an effort by the local chapter to separate itself from the state and national organization failed to meet legal requirements.

In 2023, Student PIRGs successfully used a ballot initiative at the University of Oregon to double their student automatic billing of dues at the expense of other student activities.

=== Labor practices ===
The Fund For the Public Interest has been subject to lawsuits and accusations of unfair and exploitative labor practices, and it has resisted unionization efforts by its canvassers.

In 2016, U.S. PIRG joined conservative groups in opposing the Obama Administration's rules that expanded worker overtime pay, which resulted in criticism against the organization in the popular press.

== Transparency ==
As of 2024, the U.S. PIRG Education Fund is rated at 4/4 stars by Charity Navigator, with an overall score of 92%. Charity Navigator defines a four-star review, as "Exceeds or meets best practices and industry standards across almost all areas. Likely to be a highly effective charity."

== Programs and campaigns ==
=== Consumer protection ===
U.S. PIRG's consumer protection work includes financial and product safety reforms.

U.S. PIRG lobbied for the creation of the Consumer Financial Protection Bureau, an independent U.S. government agency which was founded as a result of the Dodd–Frank Wall Street Reform and Consumer Protection Act after the Great Recession and the 2008 financial crisis. U.S. PIRG helped win passage of the Credit CARD Act of 2009, protecting consumers from certain predatory practices by credit card companies.

Product safety work includes warning consumers about potentially unsafe products in the marketplace, such as recalled baby products and food.

=== Public health ===
U.S. PIRG has called on major restaurant chains including McDonald's and KFC to end the use of meat raised with antibiotics, a practice that contributes to antibiotic-resistant bacteria in people. During the coronavirus pandemic, U.S. PIRG organized medical experts to speak about the U.S.'s response to the COVID-19 pandemic. The group of 150 sent a letter to political leaders urging them to shut down the country and start over with strategies to contain the surging coronavirus pandemic.

=== Transportation ===
U.S. PIRG and individual state PIRGs have taken positions against highway expansion or new construction projects as wastefully expensive and unneeded, helping to stop projects such as the Illiana Expressway in Illinois.

=== Higher education ===
U.S. PIRG actively lobbied for passage of the College Cost Reduction and Access Act in 2007, which reduced interest rates on student loans and increased funding for Pell Grants. It supported the expansion of open educational resources on campus and of campus food banks.

== Affiliated non-profits ==
Some PIRGs are members of a larger network of non-profit organizations called the Public Interest Network. While part of the same organization and often staffed by the same individuals, these affiliates are often presented in publications to imply they are different. In the past, they have also helped to launch a number of other independent public interest non-profits, including:

1. Citizen utility boards
2. The National Environmental Law Center
3. Frontier Group

== Local affiliates ==
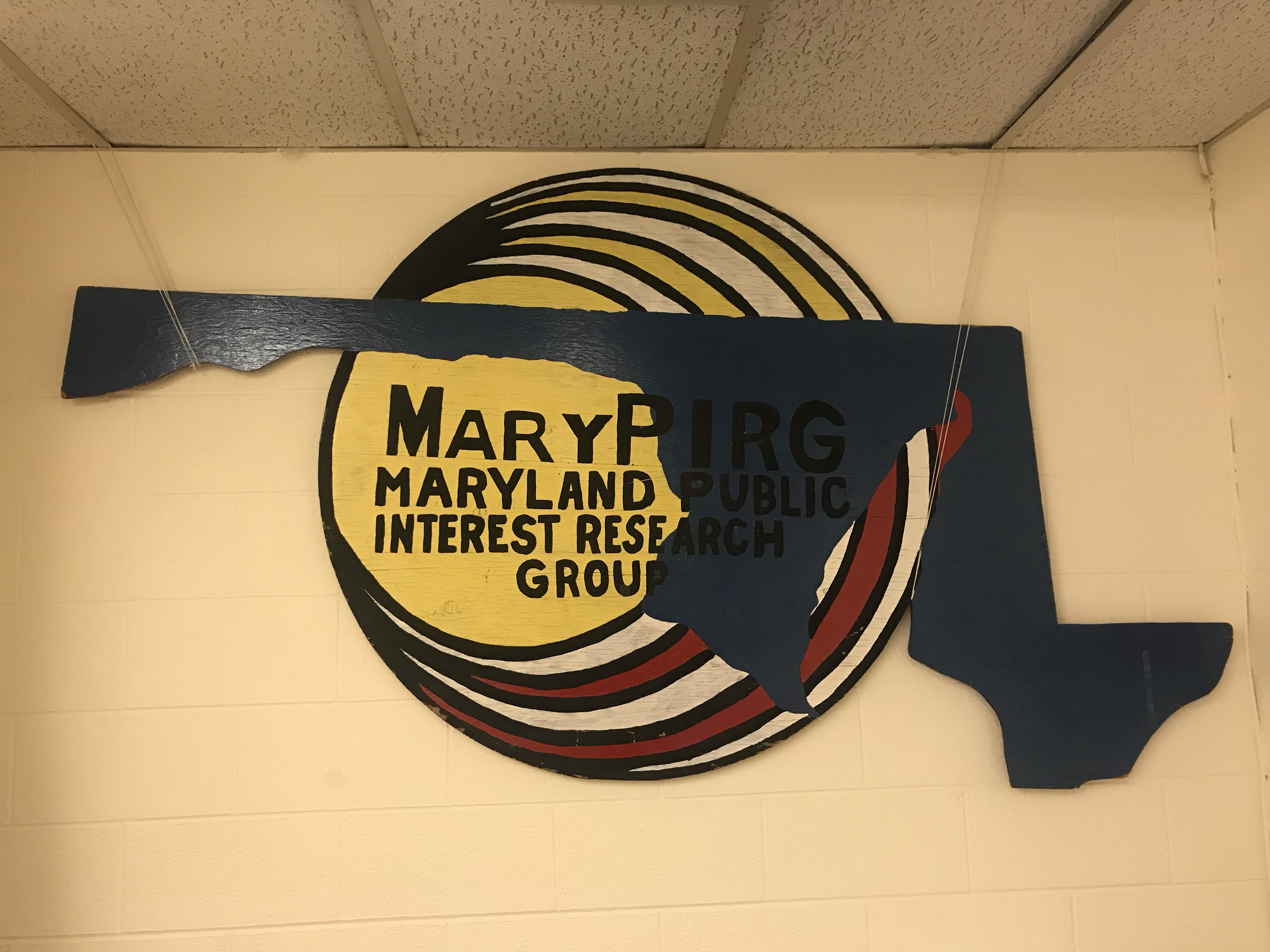
MaryPIRG logo sign

Twenty-five U.S. states have a statewide PIRG that is directly affiliated with the Public Interest Network/U.S. PIRG. Other state PIRGs that are not part of the network include the New York, Vermont, Alaska, and Minnesota PIRGs. The state PIRGs are:

- AKPIRG (Alaska)*
- Arizona PIRG
- CALPIRG (California)
- CoPIRG (Colorado)
- ConnPIRG (Connecticut)
- Florida PIRG
- Georgia PIRG
- Illinois PIRG
- Iowa PIRG
- MaryPIRG (Maryland) - activism including environmental activism, textbook trading on college campuses, and democratic reforms. They also provide internships and work study jobs for students at the University of Maryland. MaryPIRG's University of Maryland, College Park Chapter has been active since 1973.
- MassPIRG (Massachusetts)
- PIRGIM (Michigan)
- MPIRG (Minnesota)*
- MoPIRG (Missouri)
- MontPIRG (Montana)
- NHPIRG (New Hampshire)
- NJPIRG (New Jersey)
- NMPIRG (New Mexico)
- NYPIRG (New York)*
- NCPIRG (North Carolina)
- Ohio PIRG
- OSPIRG (Oregon)
- RIPIRG (Rhode Island)
- Penn PIRG (Pennsylvania)
- TexPIRG (Texas)
- VPIRG (Vermont)*
- WashPIRG (Washington)
- WisPIRG (Wisconsin)

Not affiliated with the Public Interest Network.*

In Canada, many PIRGs exist as province-wide networks, on university campuses, and as community organizations. A non-comprehensive list is below:

- OPIRG (Ontario)
- OPIRG Brock
- OPIRG Carleton
- OPIRG Guelph
- OPIRG Kingston
- OPIRG McMaster
- OPIRG Peterborough
- OPIRG Toronto
- OPIRG Windsor
- OPIRG York
- OPIRG-GRIPO Ottawa
- WPIRG (at the University of Waterloo, now defunct)
- Laurier Students' Public Interest Research Group
- QPIRG (Quebec)
- QPIRG McGill
- QPIRG Concordia
- GRIP-UQAM (QPIRG UQAM)

== See also ==
- Environment America
