= Donald Kemp Ross =

American attorney and political activist (1943–2022)

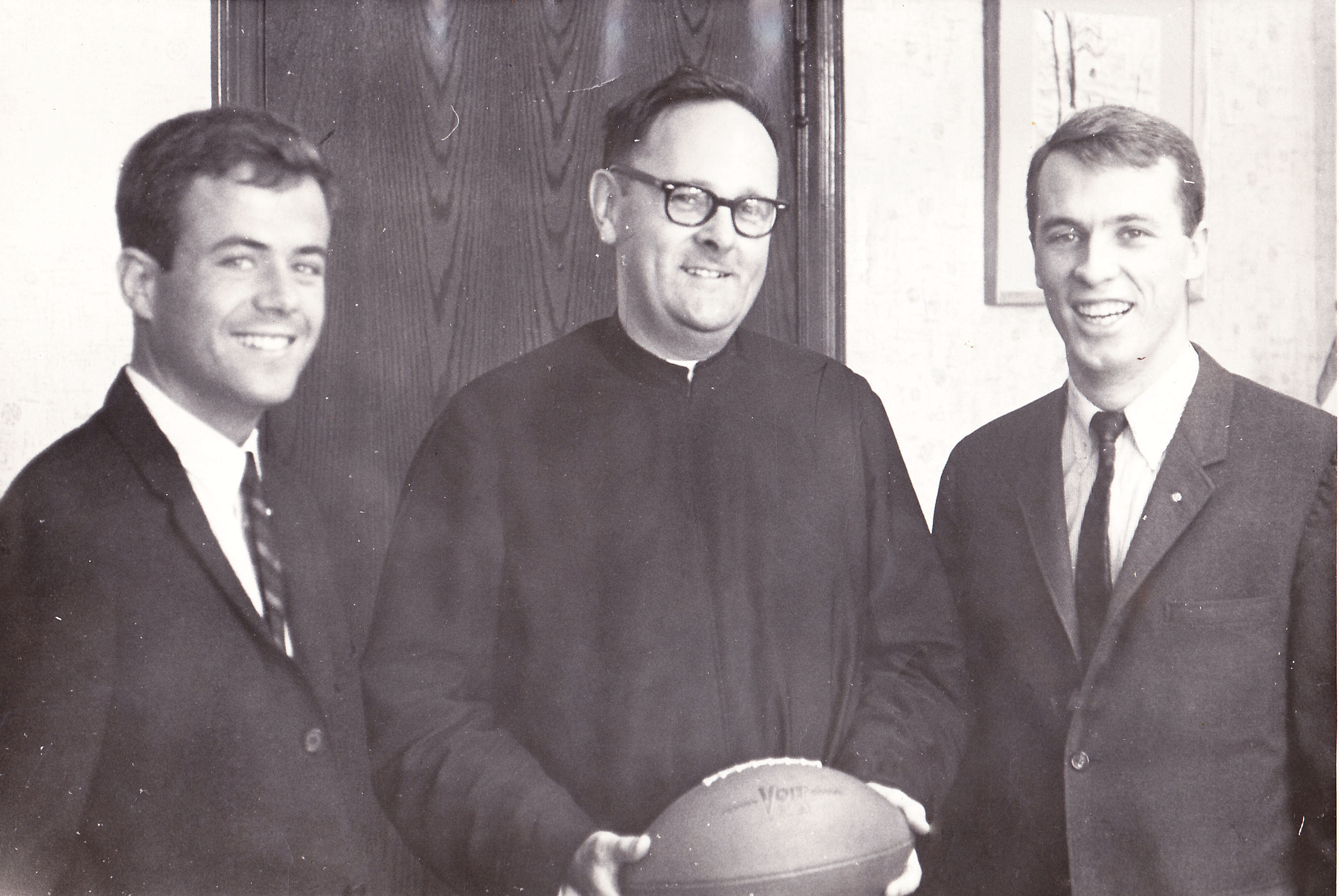
Donald Ross (left), with George McMahon, SJ, then dean of Fordham College, and David Langdon (right).

Donald Kemp Ross (June 29, 1943 – May 14, 2022) was an American public interest lawyer. Ross proposed the model of Public Interest Research Groups (PIRGS) with Ralph Nader. Ross became the first director of the NYPIRG (The New York Public Interest Research Group, Inc.). He helped to found the Albany law firm of Malkin & Ross, and its associated advocacy organization M+R Strategic Services. He has been a member of the board of directors for environmental organizations.

== Early life and education ==
Ross was the son of Helen (Kemp), a homemaker, and Hugh Ross, an administrator for the Conservation Foundation. Ross graduated with a BA in English from Fordham University, where he was student body president, in 1965. Ross served in the Peace Corps in Nigeria from 1965 to 1967.

He the attended NYU and graduated New York University School of Law in 1970.

== Career ==
While serving with Ralph Nader, Donald K. Ross wrote the book Action for a change, which proposed the organizational model for Public Interest Research Groups (PIRGS). He was the first director of the New York Public Interest Research Group, Inc. (NYPIRG). While at NYPIRG, Ross helped it grow to become the largest state-based research and advocacy organization in the nation. Ross was NYPIRG's principal strategist, lobbyist and fundraiser.

In 1984, he and Arthur Malkin founded the law firm Malkin & Ross, which is based in Albany, New York. Malkin and Ross later formed M+R Strategic Services, which is based in Washington, D.C. He worked as an attorney for Ralph Nader.

The Citizen Action Group (CAG) was the organizing arm of Public Citizen. Ross worked as CAG's head, and helped create the Parents Action Committee on Toys (PACT), the Connecticut Citizen Action Group (CCAG) as well as Public Interest Research Groups in 15 different states.

Ross has served as an adviser and officer of several non-profit organizations that are dedicated to public-interest causes, especially the environment. He served as the chief administrative officer of the Rockefeller Family fund from 1985 to 1999. In 2011, he was on the Boards of Directors for the League of Conservation Voters; that same year, he served as the chairperson of Greenpeace US.

Ross worked as a consultant for the Long Island Veatch Program, the Center for Research on Institutions and Social Policy, and The New York Community Trust.

He was one of the chief coordinators for the 1979 March on Washington and the No Nukes Rally in Battery Park City.

== Personal life ==
Ross was married to writer Helen Klein Ross. Ross died from lymphoma in Salisbury, Connecticut, on May 14, 2022. He was 78.

== Bibliography ==
- 1972 Action for Change: A Manual of Public Interest Organizing
- 1974 A Public Citizen's Action Manual
- 1977 Troubled Waters: Toxic Chemicals in the Hudson River
