= Fund for the Public Interest =

Organization

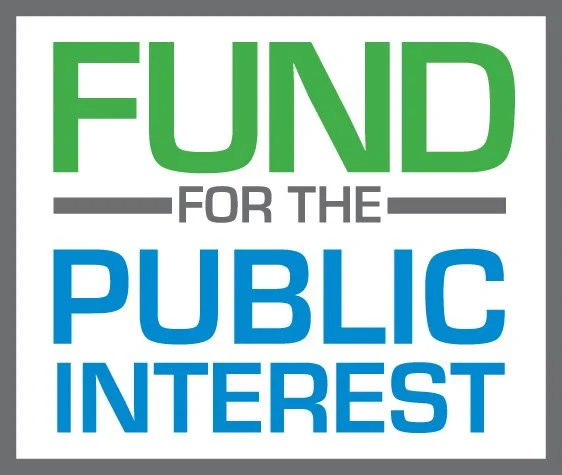
- Formation: 1982; 44 years ago
- Founded at: Massachusetts
- Type: 501(c)(4) nonprofit organization
- Headquarters: Boston, Massachusetts
- Location: United States
- Region served: United States
- Methods: Canvassing
- Affiliations: Public Interest Research Groups; Environment America
- Revenue: $15.9 million (2023)
- Expenses: $15.5 million (2023)
- Website: www.fundforthepublicinterest.org
- Formerly called: Fund for Public Interest Research

The Fund for the Public Interest (formerly Fund for Public Interest Research) is a 501(c)(4) non-profit organization that runs the public fundraising and canvassing operations for politically liberal nonprofit organizations that advocate for issues such as environmental protection, consumer safeguards and public health in the United States. FFPI was set up in 1982 as the fundraising arm of the Public Interest Research Group (PIRGs). The Fund has faced lawsuits and complaints over its labor practices.

== Operations ==
The Fund runs canvass offices, as well as other citizen engagement activities such as educating voters about issues, building the membership bases for grassroots groups, supporting grassroots advocacy (such as petition drives or letter-writing drives), and fundraising. Local directors hire canvassers to raise money for the Fund's partners and support its other campaign activities including media relations and coalition building. The Fund has canvassed for groups including the Sierra Club, the Human Rights Campaign, Environment America, and Fair Share.

The Fund operates street canvasses and door canvasses. Street canvasses send staff to stand in pedestrian traffic areas and solicit passersby to support a campaign. Door canvasses may send canvassers to neighborhoods throughout the metropolitan area where the office is located, or engage in "camping canvasses" in which canvassers drive to areas much farther from the office, camp for several nights and canvass during the day.

In 2019-2020, the last year before the pandemic, the Fund employed 5,263 people nationwide to knock on doors and make calls, raising $20 million. Canvassers are paid and often are college students working a summer job. The average employment of a canvasser lasts about two weeks, according to a 2003-2004 study. The same study noted that, of the canvassers who participated in the study in 2003 and were interviewed again in 2004, the average employment was roughly three months.

== History ==
The Fund was founded in 1982 to raise money and build membership for the state PIRGs. The Fund grew out of a Massachusetts Public Interest Research Group initiative campaign to pass the Bottle Bill where they first used door-to-door canvassing. The development of a membership and funding infrastructure independent of the campus chapters that had been until that time the center of the PIRG infrastructure reversed the decline in resources and influence that the PIRGs had been experiencing at that time, and initiated a shift in the PIRGs' organizational model that saw the previously campus-bound groups convert themselves into a mass-membership lobbying organization.

=== Labor practices and lawsuits against the Fund ===
The Fund has faced several allegations of exploitative labor practices. In 2005, the Fund's Los Angeles office was abruptly closed after employees voted to unionize with the International Brotherhood of Teamsters. In 2006, the office of the Labor Commissioner of the State of California found that the Fund had denied rest breaks to a worker. In 2009, the Fund settled a $2.15 million class-action suit alleging it subjected workers to "grueling hours without overtime pay." Canvassing employees regularly made an hourly rate less than minimum wage.

In 2012, workers at the Fund's call center in Portland, Oregon, conducted an effort to unionize with Communications Workers of America. Thirteen pro-union workers were fired from the call center. One fired worker, David Neel, proved to a National Labor Relations Board (NLRB) agent and a federal judge that his union activism was a factor in his firing. The federal judge ordered the Fund to reinstate Neel at his job. The Fund appealed the decision to the NLRB's five-member board in Washington, D.C. The Fund's appeal was denied, and the Fund was ordered to pay Neel $19,088 of backpay and interest, plus $7,000 for waiving his right to reinstatement.

== Reception of canvassing efforts ==
The book Activism, Inc.: How the Outsourcing of Grassroots Campaigns Is Strangling Progressive Politics in America by Columbia University sociologist Dana Fisher, is based on her study of a sample of Fund canvass offices during the summer of 2003. The Fund is the core of the study. A website was created to respond to a few of the criticisms raised by the book, and an article in The American Prospect was critical of Fisher's book.
